

393001–393100 

|-bgcolor=#d6d6d6
| 393001 ||  || — || March 11, 2008 || Catalina || CSS || — || align=right | 3.6 km || 
|-id=002 bgcolor=#d6d6d6
| 393002 ||  || — || March 31, 2009 || Mount Lemmon || Mount Lemmon Survey || EOS || align=right | 1.6 km || 
|-id=003 bgcolor=#d6d6d6
| 393003 ||  || — || November 17, 2007 || Kitt Peak || Spacewatch || — || align=right | 2.3 km || 
|-id=004 bgcolor=#E9E9E9
| 393004 ||  || — || January 13, 2005 || Kitt Peak || Spacewatch || — || align=right | 1.3 km || 
|-id=005 bgcolor=#fefefe
| 393005 ||  || — || December 1, 2005 || Kitt Peak || Spacewatch || V || align=right data-sort-value="0.70" | 700 m || 
|-id=006 bgcolor=#E9E9E9
| 393006 ||  || — || October 22, 2003 || Kitt Peak || Spacewatch || — || align=right | 1.7 km || 
|-id=007 bgcolor=#fefefe
| 393007 ||  || — || February 11, 2002 || Socorro || LINEAR || V || align=right data-sort-value="0.92" | 920 m || 
|-id=008 bgcolor=#E9E9E9
| 393008 ||  || — || May 25, 2007 || Mount Lemmon || Mount Lemmon Survey || — || align=right | 1.0 km || 
|-id=009 bgcolor=#E9E9E9
| 393009 ||  || — || January 2, 1997 || Kitt Peak || Spacewatch || — || align=right | 1.3 km || 
|-id=010 bgcolor=#E9E9E9
| 393010 ||  || — || September 11, 2007 || Kitt Peak || Spacewatch || — || align=right | 2.0 km || 
|-id=011 bgcolor=#d6d6d6
| 393011 ||  || — || October 2, 2006 || Mount Lemmon || Mount Lemmon Survey || EOS || align=right | 2.0 km || 
|-id=012 bgcolor=#d6d6d6
| 393012 ||  || — || March 23, 2009 || Mount Lemmon || Mount Lemmon Survey || — || align=right | 3.0 km || 
|-id=013 bgcolor=#d6d6d6
| 393013 ||  || — || March 19, 2009 || Mount Lemmon || Mount Lemmon Survey || — || align=right | 2.4 km || 
|-id=014 bgcolor=#E9E9E9
| 393014 ||  || — || October 18, 2003 || Kitt Peak || Spacewatch || — || align=right | 1.6 km || 
|-id=015 bgcolor=#E9E9E9
| 393015 ||  || — || June 21, 2007 || Mount Lemmon || Mount Lemmon Survey || — || align=right | 1.2 km || 
|-id=016 bgcolor=#E9E9E9
| 393016 ||  || — || December 30, 2008 || Mount Lemmon || Mount Lemmon Survey || HOF || align=right | 2.4 km || 
|-id=017 bgcolor=#E9E9E9
| 393017 ||  || — || December 16, 2007 || Catalina || CSS || GEF || align=right | 1.5 km || 
|-id=018 bgcolor=#d6d6d6
| 393018 ||  || — || July 6, 2005 || Siding Spring || SSS || — || align=right | 4.1 km || 
|-id=019 bgcolor=#E9E9E9
| 393019 ||  || — || December 5, 2008 || Mount Lemmon || Mount Lemmon Survey || — || align=right | 1.2 km || 
|-id=020 bgcolor=#C2FFFF
| 393020 ||  || — || September 4, 2008 || Kitt Peak || Spacewatch || L4 || align=right | 7.6 km || 
|-id=021 bgcolor=#E9E9E9
| 393021 ||  || — || October 25, 2003 || Kitt Peak || Spacewatch || — || align=right | 1.9 km || 
|-id=022 bgcolor=#E9E9E9
| 393022 ||  || — || December 1, 2008 || Mount Lemmon || Mount Lemmon Survey || — || align=right | 1.9 km || 
|-id=023 bgcolor=#fefefe
| 393023 ||  || — || December 14, 2001 || Socorro || LINEAR || — || align=right | 1.4 km || 
|-id=024 bgcolor=#E9E9E9
| 393024 ||  || — || December 6, 2008 || Catalina || CSS || — || align=right | 3.6 km || 
|-id=025 bgcolor=#d6d6d6
| 393025 ||  || — || September 19, 1995 || Kitt Peak || Spacewatch || — || align=right | 2.9 km || 
|-id=026 bgcolor=#fefefe
| 393026 ||  || — || August 14, 2007 || Siding Spring || SSS || — || align=right | 1.3 km || 
|-id=027 bgcolor=#E9E9E9
| 393027 ||  || — || November 18, 2007 || Mount Lemmon || Mount Lemmon Survey || HOF || align=right | 3.0 km || 
|-id=028 bgcolor=#d6d6d6
| 393028 ||  || — || January 19, 2008 || Mount Lemmon || Mount Lemmon Survey || — || align=right | 3.3 km || 
|-id=029 bgcolor=#d6d6d6
| 393029 ||  || — || January 10, 2008 || Catalina || CSS || — || align=right | 2.6 km || 
|-id=030 bgcolor=#d6d6d6
| 393030 ||  || — || August 29, 2006 || Kitt Peak || Spacewatch || — || align=right | 2.1 km || 
|-id=031 bgcolor=#E9E9E9
| 393031 ||  || — || December 11, 2004 || Kitt Peak || Spacewatch || — || align=right | 1.2 km || 
|-id=032 bgcolor=#d6d6d6
| 393032 ||  || — || August 25, 2004 || Kitt Peak || Spacewatch || HYG || align=right | 3.3 km || 
|-id=033 bgcolor=#d6d6d6
| 393033 ||  || — || May 28, 2009 || Kitt Peak || Spacewatch || — || align=right | 4.3 km || 
|-id=034 bgcolor=#E9E9E9
| 393034 ||  || — || April 7, 2005 || Kitt Peak || Spacewatch || — || align=right | 2.6 km || 
|-id=035 bgcolor=#d6d6d6
| 393035 ||  || — || April 10, 2005 || Mount Lemmon || Mount Lemmon Survey || — || align=right | 2.7 km || 
|-id=036 bgcolor=#d6d6d6
| 393036 ||  || — || November 17, 2006 || Catalina || CSS || — || align=right | 3.7 km || 
|-id=037 bgcolor=#d6d6d6
| 393037 ||  || — || February 13, 2008 || Catalina || CSS || — || align=right | 4.0 km || 
|-id=038 bgcolor=#d6d6d6
| 393038 ||  || — || November 17, 2006 || Kitt Peak || Spacewatch || EOS || align=right | 2.1 km || 
|-id=039 bgcolor=#E9E9E9
| 393039 ||  || — || March 4, 2000 || Kitt Peak || Spacewatch || — || align=right | 2.1 km || 
|-id=040 bgcolor=#E9E9E9
| 393040 ||  || — || March 3, 2009 || Catalina || CSS || — || align=right | 4.9 km || 
|-id=041 bgcolor=#E9E9E9
| 393041 ||  || — || June 16, 2005 || Mount Lemmon || Mount Lemmon Survey || — || align=right | 2.9 km || 
|-id=042 bgcolor=#E9E9E9
| 393042 ||  || — || February 26, 2009 || Kitt Peak || Spacewatch || — || align=right | 3.7 km || 
|-id=043 bgcolor=#d6d6d6
| 393043 ||  || — || December 18, 2001 || Socorro || LINEAR || EOS || align=right | 2.8 km || 
|-id=044 bgcolor=#d6d6d6
| 393044 ||  || — || February 18, 2008 || Mount Lemmon || Mount Lemmon Survey || EOS || align=right | 2.6 km || 
|-id=045 bgcolor=#d6d6d6
| 393045 ||  || — || November 27, 2006 || Kitt Peak || Spacewatch || — || align=right | 3.6 km || 
|-id=046 bgcolor=#E9E9E9
| 393046 ||  || — || October 4, 1997 || Kitt Peak || Spacewatch || NEM || align=right | 2.5 km || 
|-id=047 bgcolor=#d6d6d6
| 393047 ||  || — || October 17, 2006 || Mount Lemmon || Mount Lemmon Survey || — || align=right | 3.2 km || 
|-id=048 bgcolor=#d6d6d6
| 393048 ||  || — || September 30, 2005 || Mount Lemmon || Mount Lemmon Survey || 637 || align=right | 3.9 km || 
|-id=049 bgcolor=#d6d6d6
| 393049 ||  || — || February 11, 2008 || Mount Lemmon || Mount Lemmon Survey || EOS || align=right | 2.3 km || 
|-id=050 bgcolor=#C2FFFF
| 393050 ||  || — || January 3, 2013 || Mount Lemmon || Mount Lemmon Survey || L4 || align=right | 11 km || 
|-id=051 bgcolor=#d6d6d6
| 393051 ||  || — || April 23, 2010 || WISE || WISE || EOS || align=right | 2.5 km || 
|-id=052 bgcolor=#d6d6d6
| 393052 ||  || — || February 9, 2008 || Kitt Peak || Spacewatch || — || align=right | 3.0 km || 
|-id=053 bgcolor=#d6d6d6
| 393053 ||  || — || March 26, 2009 || Mount Lemmon || Mount Lemmon Survey || — || align=right | 2.8 km || 
|-id=054 bgcolor=#fefefe
| 393054 ||  || — || March 16, 2010 || Mount Lemmon || Mount Lemmon Survey || — || align=right | 1.1 km || 
|-id=055 bgcolor=#d6d6d6
| 393055 ||  || — || February 7, 2008 || Mount Lemmon || Mount Lemmon Survey || — || align=right | 2.4 km || 
|-id=056 bgcolor=#E9E9E9
| 393056 ||  || — || April 25, 2006 || Kitt Peak || Spacewatch || RAF || align=right | 1.0 km || 
|-id=057 bgcolor=#d6d6d6
| 393057 ||  || — || December 14, 2001 || Socorro || LINEAR || EOS || align=right | 2.6 km || 
|-id=058 bgcolor=#d6d6d6
| 393058 ||  || — || December 14, 2001 || Socorro || LINEAR || — || align=right | 3.1 km || 
|-id=059 bgcolor=#C2FFFF
| 393059 ||  || — || June 21, 2007 || Mount Lemmon || Mount Lemmon Survey || L4 || align=right | 11 km || 
|-id=060 bgcolor=#E9E9E9
| 393060 ||  || — || April 10, 2005 || Mount Lemmon || Mount Lemmon Survey || — || align=right | 2.0 km || 
|-id=061 bgcolor=#E9E9E9
| 393061 ||  || — || January 25, 2009 || Catalina || CSS || — || align=right | 1.3 km || 
|-id=062 bgcolor=#d6d6d6
| 393062 ||  || — || October 20, 2006 || Kitt Peak || Spacewatch || — || align=right | 5.6 km || 
|-id=063 bgcolor=#E9E9E9
| 393063 ||  || — || March 10, 2005 || Catalina || CSS || — || align=right | 3.4 km || 
|-id=064 bgcolor=#fefefe
| 393064 ||  || — || September 24, 2000 || Socorro || LINEAR || V || align=right data-sort-value="0.86" | 860 m || 
|-id=065 bgcolor=#E9E9E9
| 393065 ||  || — || September 18, 2007 || Siding Spring || SSS || BAR || align=right | 1.7 km || 
|-id=066 bgcolor=#E9E9E9
| 393066 ||  || — || April 30, 2006 || Kitt Peak || Spacewatch || — || align=right data-sort-value="0.95" | 950 m || 
|-id=067 bgcolor=#d6d6d6
| 393067 ||  || — || February 8, 2008 || Kitt Peak || Spacewatch || EOS || align=right | 2.2 km || 
|-id=068 bgcolor=#d6d6d6
| 393068 ||  || — || March 2, 2009 || Kitt Peak || Spacewatch || — || align=right | 5.3 km || 
|-id=069 bgcolor=#d6d6d6
| 393069 ||  || — || October 31, 2011 || Mount Lemmon || Mount Lemmon Survey || — || align=right | 2.7 km || 
|-id=070 bgcolor=#d6d6d6
| 393070 ||  || — || November 20, 2006 || Kitt Peak || Spacewatch || — || align=right | 3.6 km || 
|-id=071 bgcolor=#d6d6d6
| 393071 ||  || — || October 21, 2006 || Mount Lemmon || Mount Lemmon Survey || — || align=right | 2.8 km || 
|-id=072 bgcolor=#fefefe
| 393072 ||  || — || October 2, 2000 || Socorro || LINEAR || NYS || align=right data-sort-value="0.79" | 790 m || 
|-id=073 bgcolor=#E9E9E9
| 393073 ||  || — || August 19, 2006 || Kitt Peak || Spacewatch || — || align=right | 2.9 km || 
|-id=074 bgcolor=#d6d6d6
| 393074 ||  || — || December 10, 2006 || Kitt Peak || Spacewatch || — || align=right | 3.4 km || 
|-id=075 bgcolor=#d6d6d6
| 393075 ||  || — || February 7, 2008 || Mount Lemmon || Mount Lemmon Survey || — || align=right | 2.8 km || 
|-id=076 bgcolor=#d6d6d6
| 393076 ||  || — || March 1, 2009 || Kitt Peak || Spacewatch || — || align=right | 2.9 km || 
|-id=077 bgcolor=#d6d6d6
| 393077 ||  || — || June 16, 2004 || Kitt Peak || Spacewatch || — || align=right | 4.2 km || 
|-id=078 bgcolor=#E9E9E9
| 393078 ||  || — || December 19, 2003 || Kitt Peak || Spacewatch || NEM || align=right | 2.5 km || 
|-id=079 bgcolor=#d6d6d6
| 393079 ||  || — || December 25, 2006 || Kitt Peak || Spacewatch || SYL7:4 || align=right | 3.8 km || 
|-id=080 bgcolor=#E9E9E9
| 393080 ||  || — || March 1, 2009 || Mount Lemmon || Mount Lemmon Survey || MRX || align=right | 1.3 km || 
|-id=081 bgcolor=#d6d6d6
| 393081 ||  || — || July 15, 2005 || Kitt Peak || Spacewatch || EOS || align=right | 2.0 km || 
|-id=082 bgcolor=#fefefe
| 393082 ||  || — || November 27, 2000 || Kitt Peak || Spacewatch || — || align=right | 1.6 km || 
|-id=083 bgcolor=#d6d6d6
| 393083 ||  || — || November 25, 2006 || Mount Lemmon || Mount Lemmon Survey || — || align=right | 3.3 km || 
|-id=084 bgcolor=#d6d6d6
| 393084 ||  || — || March 27, 2004 || Kitt Peak || Spacewatch || FIR || align=right | 5.1 km || 
|-id=085 bgcolor=#d6d6d6
| 393085 ||  || — || December 13, 2006 || Kitt Peak || Spacewatch || EOS || align=right | 2.4 km || 
|-id=086 bgcolor=#d6d6d6
| 393086 ||  || — || December 19, 2007 || Mount Lemmon || Mount Lemmon Survey || — || align=right | 2.9 km || 
|-id=087 bgcolor=#d6d6d6
| 393087 ||  || — || October 7, 2005 || Kitt Peak || Spacewatch || — || align=right | 2.5 km || 
|-id=088 bgcolor=#E9E9E9
| 393088 ||  || — || September 11, 2007 || Kitt Peak || Spacewatch || — || align=right data-sort-value="0.92" | 920 m || 
|-id=089 bgcolor=#d6d6d6
| 393089 ||  || — || February 8, 2008 || Mount Lemmon || Mount Lemmon Survey || — || align=right | 3.1 km || 
|-id=090 bgcolor=#d6d6d6
| 393090 ||  || — || March 26, 2009 || Mount Lemmon || Mount Lemmon Survey || — || align=right | 2.9 km || 
|-id=091 bgcolor=#d6d6d6
| 393091 ||  || — || June 12, 2010 || WISE || WISE || — || align=right | 2.3 km || 
|-id=092 bgcolor=#d6d6d6
| 393092 ||  || — || December 1, 2006 || Mount Lemmon || Mount Lemmon Survey || — || align=right | 3.8 km || 
|-id=093 bgcolor=#d6d6d6
| 393093 ||  || — || December 22, 2006 || Kitt Peak || Spacewatch || EOS || align=right | 2.6 km || 
|-id=094 bgcolor=#E9E9E9
| 393094 ||  || — || November 24, 2008 || Mount Lemmon || Mount Lemmon Survey || — || align=right | 1.1 km || 
|-id=095 bgcolor=#E9E9E9
| 393095 ||  || — || October 10, 2007 || Mount Lemmon || Mount Lemmon Survey || — || align=right | 2.0 km || 
|-id=096 bgcolor=#E9E9E9
| 393096 ||  || — || November 20, 2007 || Kitt Peak || Spacewatch || WIT || align=right | 1.1 km || 
|-id=097 bgcolor=#C2FFFF
| 393097 ||  || — || September 17, 2009 || Kitt Peak || Spacewatch || L4 || align=right | 10 km || 
|-id=098 bgcolor=#C2FFFF
| 393098 ||  || — || December 30, 2000 || Kitt Peak || Spacewatch || L4 || align=right | 6.8 km || 
|-id=099 bgcolor=#C2FFFF
| 393099 ||  || — || October 30, 2010 || Mount Lemmon || Mount Lemmon Survey || L4 || align=right | 11 km || 
|-id=100 bgcolor=#C2FFFF
| 393100 ||  || — || September 6, 2008 || Mount Lemmon || Mount Lemmon Survey || L4 || align=right | 9.7 km || 
|}

393101–393200 

|-bgcolor=#d6d6d6
| 393101 ||  || — || November 21, 2006 || Mount Lemmon || Mount Lemmon Survey || — || align=right | 2.7 km || 
|-id=102 bgcolor=#d6d6d6
| 393102 ||  || — || March 31, 2009 || Mount Lemmon || Mount Lemmon Survey || EOS || align=right | 1.8 km || 
|-id=103 bgcolor=#d6d6d6
| 393103 ||  || — || August 30, 2005 || Kitt Peak || Spacewatch || — || align=right | 3.1 km || 
|-id=104 bgcolor=#E9E9E9
| 393104 ||  || — || October 23, 2006 || Kitt Peak || Spacewatch || DOR || align=right | 2.7 km || 
|-id=105 bgcolor=#d6d6d6
| 393105 ||  || — || September 24, 2000 || Socorro || LINEAR || — || align=right | 3.7 km || 
|-id=106 bgcolor=#d6d6d6
| 393106 ||  || — || October 9, 2005 || Kitt Peak || Spacewatch || — || align=right | 3.5 km || 
|-id=107 bgcolor=#C2FFFF
| 393107 ||  || — || November 18, 2011 || Kitt Peak || Spacewatch || L4 || align=right | 12 km || 
|-id=108 bgcolor=#C2FFFF
| 393108 ||  || — || September 24, 2009 || Mount Lemmon || Mount Lemmon Survey || L4 || align=right | 8.6 km || 
|-id=109 bgcolor=#C2FFFF
| 393109 ||  || — || February 7, 2002 || Kitt Peak || Spacewatch || L4 || align=right | 8.1 km || 
|-id=110 bgcolor=#d6d6d6
| 393110 ||  || — || September 25, 2005 || Catalina || CSS || — || align=right | 4.1 km || 
|-id=111 bgcolor=#E9E9E9
| 393111 ||  || — || September 10, 2007 || Mount Lemmon || Mount Lemmon Survey || WIT || align=right | 1.1 km || 
|-id=112 bgcolor=#fefefe
| 393112 ||  || — || October 14, 2001 || Socorro || LINEAR || — || align=right data-sort-value="0.98" | 980 m || 
|-id=113 bgcolor=#E9E9E9
| 393113 ||  || — || November 5, 2007 || Kitt Peak || Spacewatch || AGN || align=right | 1.3 km || 
|-id=114 bgcolor=#fefefe
| 393114 ||  || — || September 24, 2000 || Socorro || LINEAR || — || align=right | 1.1 km || 
|-id=115 bgcolor=#fefefe
| 393115 ||  || — || November 3, 1999 || Catalina || CSS || — || align=right data-sort-value="0.73" | 730 m || 
|-id=116 bgcolor=#d6d6d6
| 393116 ||  || — || March 31, 2003 || Kitt Peak || Spacewatch || — || align=right | 3.9 km || 
|-id=117 bgcolor=#d6d6d6
| 393117 ||  || — || March 11, 2008 || Catalina || CSS || — || align=right | 4.5 km || 
|-id=118 bgcolor=#d6d6d6
| 393118 ||  || — || April 25, 2004 || Kitt Peak || Spacewatch || — || align=right | 3.6 km || 
|-id=119 bgcolor=#d6d6d6
| 393119 ||  || — || October 21, 2006 || Mount Lemmon || Mount Lemmon Survey || — || align=right | 2.8 km || 
|-id=120 bgcolor=#d6d6d6
| 393120 ||  || — || November 2, 2006 || Mount Lemmon || Mount Lemmon Survey || — || align=right | 3.6 km || 
|-id=121 bgcolor=#d6d6d6
| 393121 ||  || — || March 22, 2009 || Mount Lemmon || Mount Lemmon Survey || — || align=right | 2.9 km || 
|-id=122 bgcolor=#E9E9E9
| 393122 ||  || — || April 2, 2005 || Mount Lemmon || Mount Lemmon Survey || — || align=right data-sort-value="0.97" | 970 m || 
|-id=123 bgcolor=#E9E9E9
| 393123 ||  || — || March 2, 2009 || Kitt Peak || Spacewatch || — || align=right | 2.4 km || 
|-id=124 bgcolor=#d6d6d6
| 393124 ||  || — || November 16, 2006 || Kitt Peak || Spacewatch || — || align=right | 2.7 km || 
|-id=125 bgcolor=#d6d6d6
| 393125 ||  || — || February 9, 2008 || Mount Lemmon || Mount Lemmon Survey || — || align=right | 2.9 km || 
|-id=126 bgcolor=#d6d6d6
| 393126 ||  || — || January 6, 2002 || Kitt Peak || Spacewatch || EOS || align=right | 1.9 km || 
|-id=127 bgcolor=#d6d6d6
| 393127 ||  || — || September 1, 2005 || Kitt Peak || Spacewatch || — || align=right | 2.6 km || 
|-id=128 bgcolor=#d6d6d6
| 393128 ||  || — || September 12, 2001 || Socorro || LINEAR || KOR || align=right | 1.7 km || 
|-id=129 bgcolor=#d6d6d6
| 393129 ||  || — || January 12, 2002 || Kitt Peak || Spacewatch || — || align=right | 2.3 km || 
|-id=130 bgcolor=#d6d6d6
| 393130 ||  || — || December 31, 2007 || Mount Lemmon || Mount Lemmon Survey || KOR || align=right | 1.2 km || 
|-id=131 bgcolor=#d6d6d6
| 393131 ||  || — || April 30, 2009 || Kitt Peak || Spacewatch || — || align=right | 2.9 km || 
|-id=132 bgcolor=#fefefe
| 393132 ||  || — || January 23, 2006 || Kitt Peak || Spacewatch || — || align=right | 1.3 km || 
|-id=133 bgcolor=#fefefe
| 393133 ||  || — || May 11, 2007 || Mount Lemmon || Mount Lemmon Survey || — || align=right data-sort-value="0.90" | 900 m || 
|-id=134 bgcolor=#E9E9E9
| 393134 ||  || — || May 16, 2005 || Mount Lemmon || Mount Lemmon Survey || HOF || align=right | 3.0 km || 
|-id=135 bgcolor=#C2FFFF
| 393135 ||  || — || October 17, 2010 || Mount Lemmon || Mount Lemmon Survey || L4 || align=right | 7.2 km || 
|-id=136 bgcolor=#d6d6d6
| 393136 ||  || — || February 13, 2002 || Kitt Peak || Spacewatch || THM || align=right | 2.7 km || 
|-id=137 bgcolor=#d6d6d6
| 393137 ||  || — || November 19, 2006 || Catalina || CSS || — || align=right | 3.7 km || 
|-id=138 bgcolor=#E9E9E9
| 393138 ||  || — || February 16, 2004 || Kitt Peak || Spacewatch || — || align=right | 2.6 km || 
|-id=139 bgcolor=#d6d6d6
| 393139 ||  || — || December 10, 2006 || Kitt Peak || Spacewatch || VER || align=right | 2.9 km || 
|-id=140 bgcolor=#E9E9E9
| 393140 ||  || — || May 9, 2005 || Mount Lemmon || Mount Lemmon Survey || AGN || align=right | 1.3 km || 
|-id=141 bgcolor=#d6d6d6
| 393141 ||  || — || January 8, 2002 || Socorro || LINEAR || — || align=right | 4.3 km || 
|-id=142 bgcolor=#d6d6d6
| 393142 ||  || — || March 11, 2008 || Catalina || CSS || — || align=right | 4.1 km || 
|-id=143 bgcolor=#d6d6d6
| 393143 ||  || — || May 16, 2009 || Kitt Peak || Spacewatch || — || align=right | 3.3 km || 
|-id=144 bgcolor=#C2FFFF
| 393144 ||  || — || September 29, 2009 || Mount Lemmon || Mount Lemmon Survey || L4ERY || align=right | 8.3 km || 
|-id=145 bgcolor=#E9E9E9
| 393145 ||  || — || September 15, 2006 || Kitt Peak || Spacewatch || — || align=right | 2.5 km || 
|-id=146 bgcolor=#E9E9E9
| 393146 ||  || — || May 25, 2006 || Mount Lemmon || Mount Lemmon Survey || — || align=right | 1.4 km || 
|-id=147 bgcolor=#E9E9E9
| 393147 ||  || — || May 14, 2005 || Mount Lemmon || Mount Lemmon Survey || — || align=right | 2.6 km || 
|-id=148 bgcolor=#d6d6d6
| 393148 ||  || — || March 24, 2003 || Kitt Peak || Spacewatch || EOS || align=right | 4.5 km || 
|-id=149 bgcolor=#C2FFFF
| 393149 ||  || — || September 19, 2008 || Kitt Peak || Spacewatch || L4 || align=right | 7.8 km || 
|-id=150 bgcolor=#E9E9E9
| 393150 ||  || — || March 15, 2004 || Campo Imperatore || CINEOS || HOF || align=right | 3.7 km || 
|-id=151 bgcolor=#d6d6d6
| 393151 ||  || — || October 21, 2006 || Mount Lemmon || Mount Lemmon Survey || — || align=right | 2.5 km || 
|-id=152 bgcolor=#d6d6d6
| 393152 ||  || — || January 14, 2002 || Kitt Peak || Spacewatch || VER || align=right | 2.5 km || 
|-id=153 bgcolor=#E9E9E9
| 393153 ||  || — || February 22, 2009 || Kitt Peak || Spacewatch || DOR || align=right | 2.8 km || 
|-id=154 bgcolor=#E9E9E9
| 393154 ||  || — || March 13, 2005 || Mount Lemmon || Mount Lemmon Survey || — || align=right | 2.8 km || 
|-id=155 bgcolor=#C2FFFF
| 393155 ||  || — || September 18, 2009 || Kitt Peak || Spacewatch || L4 || align=right | 6.5 km || 
|-id=156 bgcolor=#C2FFFF
| 393156 ||  || — || January 2, 2012 || Mount Lemmon || Mount Lemmon Survey || L4 || align=right | 6.6 km || 
|-id=157 bgcolor=#C2FFFF
| 393157 ||  || — || January 24, 2001 || Kitt Peak || Spacewatch || L4 || align=right | 12 km || 
|-id=158 bgcolor=#d6d6d6
| 393158 ||  || — || August 27, 2006 || Kitt Peak || Spacewatch || KOR || align=right | 1.3 km || 
|-id=159 bgcolor=#d6d6d6
| 393159 ||  || — || August 29, 2005 || Kitt Peak || Spacewatch || — || align=right | 3.4 km || 
|-id=160 bgcolor=#E9E9E9
| 393160 ||  || — || April 2, 2009 || Mount Lemmon || Mount Lemmon Survey || — || align=right | 2.7 km || 
|-id=161 bgcolor=#E9E9E9
| 393161 ||  || — || May 10, 2005 || Kitt Peak || Spacewatch || — || align=right | 2.3 km || 
|-id=162 bgcolor=#d6d6d6
| 393162 ||  || — || January 5, 2002 || Kitt Peak || Spacewatch || — || align=right | 3.7 km || 
|-id=163 bgcolor=#d6d6d6
| 393163 ||  || — || September 14, 2005 || Kitt Peak || Spacewatch || — || align=right | 2.7 km || 
|-id=164 bgcolor=#d6d6d6
| 393164 ||  || — || November 14, 2006 || Kitt Peak || Spacewatch || — || align=right | 2.7 km || 
|-id=165 bgcolor=#C2FFFF
| 393165 ||  || — || September 29, 2009 || Mount Lemmon || Mount Lemmon Survey || L4 || align=right | 7.6 km || 
|-id=166 bgcolor=#d6d6d6
| 393166 ||  || — || April 21, 1998 || Kitt Peak || Spacewatch || — || align=right | 3.0 km || 
|-id=167 bgcolor=#d6d6d6
| 393167 ||  || — || August 20, 2004 || Kitt Peak || Spacewatch || URS || align=right | 4.3 km || 
|-id=168 bgcolor=#d6d6d6
| 393168 ||  || — || July 8, 2005 || Kitt Peak || Spacewatch || EOS || align=right | 1.9 km || 
|-id=169 bgcolor=#d6d6d6
| 393169 ||  || — || November 9, 1993 || Kitt Peak || Spacewatch || LUT || align=right | 4.3 km || 
|-id=170 bgcolor=#C2FFFF
| 393170 ||  || — || September 27, 2009 || Mount Lemmon || Mount Lemmon Survey || L4 || align=right | 8.5 km || 
|-id=171 bgcolor=#E9E9E9
| 393171 ||  || — || January 11, 2000 || Kitt Peak || Spacewatch || — || align=right | 1.9 km || 
|-id=172 bgcolor=#d6d6d6
| 393172 ||  || — || February 25, 2006 || Kitt Peak || Spacewatch || 3:2 || align=right | 4.9 km || 
|-id=173 bgcolor=#d6d6d6
| 393173 ||  || — || January 16, 2008 || Kitt Peak || Spacewatch || — || align=right | 2.9 km || 
|-id=174 bgcolor=#d6d6d6
| 393174 ||  || — || October 27, 2005 || Catalina || CSS || TIR || align=right | 2.0 km || 
|-id=175 bgcolor=#d6d6d6
| 393175 ||  || — || March 2, 2008 || Kitt Peak || Spacewatch || EOS || align=right | 2.2 km || 
|-id=176 bgcolor=#d6d6d6
| 393176 ||  || — || March 31, 2008 || Mount Lemmon || Mount Lemmon Survey || VER || align=right | 3.3 km || 
|-id=177 bgcolor=#C2FFFF
| 393177 ||  || — || October 17, 2010 || Mount Lemmon || Mount Lemmon Survey || L4 || align=right | 6.7 km || 
|-id=178 bgcolor=#d6d6d6
| 393178 ||  || — || February 10, 2008 || Kitt Peak || Spacewatch || — || align=right | 3.6 km || 
|-id=179 bgcolor=#d6d6d6
| 393179 ||  || — || October 28, 2005 || Mount Lemmon || Mount Lemmon Survey || HYG || align=right | 3.2 km || 
|-id=180 bgcolor=#d6d6d6
| 393180 ||  || — || March 4, 2008 || Kitt Peak || Spacewatch || EOS || align=right | 2.0 km || 
|-id=181 bgcolor=#d6d6d6
| 393181 ||  || — || June 15, 2010 || WISE || WISE || — || align=right | 2.7 km || 
|-id=182 bgcolor=#C2FFFF
| 393182 ||  || — || February 17, 2001 || Kitt Peak || Spacewatch || L4 || align=right | 9.5 km || 
|-id=183 bgcolor=#d6d6d6
| 393183 ||  || — || August 8, 1999 || Kitt Peak || Spacewatch || URS || align=right | 3.2 km || 
|-id=184 bgcolor=#d6d6d6
| 393184 ||  || — || January 17, 2005 || Kitt Peak || Spacewatch || SHU3:2 || align=right | 8.9 km || 
|-id=185 bgcolor=#E9E9E9
| 393185 ||  || — || November 18, 2007 || Mount Lemmon || Mount Lemmon Survey || — || align=right | 1.9 km || 
|-id=186 bgcolor=#C2FFFF
| 393186 ||  || — || September 11, 2007 || Kitt Peak || Spacewatch || L4 || align=right | 10 km || 
|-id=187 bgcolor=#d6d6d6
| 393187 ||  || — || February 2, 2005 || Kitt Peak || Spacewatch || HIL3:2 || align=right | 6.4 km || 
|-id=188 bgcolor=#E9E9E9
| 393188 ||  || — || April 7, 2005 || Kitt Peak || Spacewatch || — || align=right | 2.5 km || 
|-id=189 bgcolor=#d6d6d6
| 393189 ||  || — || January 13, 2005 || Kitt Peak || Spacewatch || 3:2 || align=right | 5.7 km || 
|-id=190 bgcolor=#d6d6d6
| 393190 ||  || — || April 9, 2003 || Kitt Peak || Spacewatch || — || align=right | 2.8 km || 
|-id=191 bgcolor=#d6d6d6
| 393191 ||  || — || February 10, 1996 || Kitt Peak || Spacewatch || — || align=right | 3.0 km || 
|-id=192 bgcolor=#E9E9E9
| 393192 ||  || — || June 5, 2010 || Kitt Peak || Spacewatch || MAR || align=right | 1.3 km || 
|-id=193 bgcolor=#d6d6d6
| 393193 ||  || — || March 10, 2008 || Catalina || CSS || TIR || align=right | 3.5 km || 
|-id=194 bgcolor=#d6d6d6
| 393194 ||  || — || November 20, 1995 || Kitt Peak || Spacewatch || — || align=right | 3.3 km || 
|-id=195 bgcolor=#E9E9E9
| 393195 ||  || — || January 7, 1995 || Kitt Peak || Spacewatch || — || align=right | 1.9 km || 
|-id=196 bgcolor=#d6d6d6
| 393196 ||  || — || January 25, 2002 || Socorro || LINEAR || EUP || align=right | 5.3 km || 
|-id=197 bgcolor=#d6d6d6
| 393197 ||  || — || April 29, 2003 || Kitt Peak || Spacewatch || ALA || align=right | 3.8 km || 
|-id=198 bgcolor=#d6d6d6
| 393198 ||  || — || December 12, 2006 || Socorro || LINEAR || — || align=right | 3.8 km || 
|-id=199 bgcolor=#C2FFFF
| 393199 ||  || — || April 24, 2004 || Kitt Peak || Spacewatch || L4 || align=right | 9.7 km || 
|-id=200 bgcolor=#C2FFFF
| 393200 ||  || — || December 31, 2011 || Mount Lemmon || Mount Lemmon Survey || L4 || align=right | 7.8 km || 
|}

393201–393300 

|-bgcolor=#E9E9E9
| 393201 ||  || — || October 12, 2007 || Mount Lemmon || Mount Lemmon Survey || — || align=right | 1.3 km || 
|-id=202 bgcolor=#C2FFFF
| 393202 ||  || — || October 2, 2008 || Mount Lemmon || Mount Lemmon Survey || L4 || align=right | 8.1 km || 
|-id=203 bgcolor=#d6d6d6
| 393203 ||  || — || November 24, 2006 || Kitt Peak || Spacewatch || — || align=right | 3.0 km || 
|-id=204 bgcolor=#d6d6d6
| 393204 ||  || — || March 31, 2008 || Mount Lemmon || Mount Lemmon Survey || HYG || align=right | 3.3 km || 
|-id=205 bgcolor=#C2FFFF
| 393205 ||  || — || September 26, 2009 || Kitt Peak || Spacewatch || L4 || align=right | 6.9 km || 
|-id=206 bgcolor=#C2FFFF
| 393206 ||  || — || September 5, 2008 || Kitt Peak || Spacewatch || L4 || align=right | 6.9 km || 
|-id=207 bgcolor=#d6d6d6
| 393207 ||  || — || April 7, 2003 || Kitt Peak || Spacewatch || — || align=right | 2.8 km || 
|-id=208 bgcolor=#C2FFFF
| 393208 ||  || — || September 16, 2009 || Kitt Peak || Spacewatch || L4 || align=right | 7.0 km || 
|-id=209 bgcolor=#C2FFFF
| 393209 ||  || — || July 26, 1995 || Kitt Peak || Spacewatch || L4 || align=right | 7.4 km || 
|-id=210 bgcolor=#fefefe
| 393210 ||  || — || December 13, 2004 || Campo Imperatore || CINEOS || — || align=right | 1.4 km || 
|-id=211 bgcolor=#C2FFFF
| 393211 ||  || — || October 12, 2010 || Mount Lemmon || Mount Lemmon Survey || L4 || align=right | 8.1 km || 
|-id=212 bgcolor=#d6d6d6
| 393212 ||  || — || December 3, 2000 || Kitt Peak || Spacewatch || — || align=right | 3.4 km || 
|-id=213 bgcolor=#d6d6d6
| 393213 ||  || — || October 4, 2006 || Mount Lemmon || Mount Lemmon Survey || — || align=right | 4.8 km || 
|-id=214 bgcolor=#d6d6d6
| 393214 ||  || — || May 27, 2003 || Kitt Peak || Spacewatch || — || align=right | 3.2 km || 
|-id=215 bgcolor=#C2FFFF
| 393215 ||  || — || October 18, 2007 || Kitt Peak || Spacewatch || L4 || align=right | 11 km || 
|-id=216 bgcolor=#C2FFFF
| 393216 ||  || — || January 28, 2000 || Kitt Peak || Spacewatch || L4 || align=right | 7.5 km || 
|-id=217 bgcolor=#d6d6d6
| 393217 ||  || — || January 27, 2007 || Mount Lemmon || Mount Lemmon Survey || 7:4 || align=right | 3.7 km || 
|-id=218 bgcolor=#d6d6d6
| 393218 ||  || — || January 14, 2002 || Kitt Peak || Spacewatch || — || align=right | 3.3 km || 
|-id=219 bgcolor=#fefefe
| 393219 ||  || — || April 6, 2010 || Kitt Peak || Spacewatch || — || align=right data-sort-value="0.74" | 740 m || 
|-id=220 bgcolor=#fefefe
| 393220 ||  || — || October 9, 2004 || Kitt Peak || Spacewatch || NYS || align=right data-sort-value="0.63" | 630 m || 
|-id=221 bgcolor=#d6d6d6
| 393221 ||  || — || September 20, 1998 || Kitt Peak || Spacewatch || — || align=right | 3.5 km || 
|-id=222 bgcolor=#fefefe
| 393222 ||  || — || August 10, 2007 || Kitt Peak || Spacewatch || V || align=right data-sort-value="0.74" | 740 m || 
|-id=223 bgcolor=#d6d6d6
| 393223 ||  || — || November 16, 2006 || Kitt Peak || Spacewatch || LUT || align=right | 5.6 km || 
|-id=224 bgcolor=#fefefe
| 393224 ||  || — || December 19, 2004 || Mount Lemmon || Mount Lemmon Survey || V || align=right data-sort-value="0.84" | 840 m || 
|-id=225 bgcolor=#C2FFFF
| 393225 ||  || — || September 4, 2008 || Kitt Peak || Spacewatch || L4 || align=right | 9.9 km || 
|-id=226 bgcolor=#d6d6d6
| 393226 ||  || — || September 30, 1999 || Kitt Peak || Spacewatch || — || align=right | 3.4 km || 
|-id=227 bgcolor=#fefefe
| 393227 ||  || — || February 20, 2009 || Kitt Peak || Spacewatch || — || align=right | 1.0 km || 
|-id=228 bgcolor=#fefefe
| 393228 ||  || — || April 2, 2006 || Kitt Peak || Spacewatch || FLO || align=right data-sort-value="0.79" | 790 m || 
|-id=229 bgcolor=#d6d6d6
| 393229 ||  || — || January 15, 1996 || Kitt Peak || Spacewatch || — || align=right | 2.7 km || 
|-id=230 bgcolor=#d6d6d6
| 393230 ||  || — || December 21, 2005 || Catalina || CSS || — || align=right | 5.5 km || 
|-id=231 bgcolor=#d6d6d6
| 393231 ||  || — || November 22, 2005 || Kitt Peak || Spacewatch || — || align=right | 3.9 km || 
|-id=232 bgcolor=#d6d6d6
| 393232 ||  || — || July 25, 2010 || WISE || WISE || — || align=right | 3.7 km || 
|-id=233 bgcolor=#E9E9E9
| 393233 ||  || — || March 10, 2008 || Mount Lemmon || Mount Lemmon Survey || PAD || align=right | 2.1 km || 
|-id=234 bgcolor=#fefefe
| 393234 ||  || — || October 16, 2003 || Kitt Peak || Spacewatch || NYS || align=right data-sort-value="0.68" | 680 m || 
|-id=235 bgcolor=#fefefe
| 393235 ||  || — || March 17, 2004 || Kitt Peak || Spacewatch || — || align=right | 1.4 km || 
|-id=236 bgcolor=#E9E9E9
| 393236 ||  || — || August 7, 1999 || Anderson Mesa || LONEOS || — || align=right | 2.5 km || 
|-id=237 bgcolor=#d6d6d6
| 393237 ||  || — || January 9, 2006 || Kitt Peak || Spacewatch || TRE || align=right | 2.8 km || 
|-id=238 bgcolor=#E9E9E9
| 393238 ||  || — || May 23, 2003 || Kitt Peak || Spacewatch || — || align=right | 2.4 km || 
|-id=239 bgcolor=#E9E9E9
| 393239 ||  || — || December 29, 2005 || Kitt Peak || Spacewatch || — || align=right | 1.7 km || 
|-id=240 bgcolor=#fefefe
| 393240 ||  || — || March 8, 2005 || Anderson Mesa || LONEOS || — || align=right data-sort-value="0.88" | 880 m || 
|-id=241 bgcolor=#E9E9E9
| 393241 ||  || — || September 17, 2009 || Kitt Peak || Spacewatch || — || align=right | 1.3 km || 
|-id=242 bgcolor=#d6d6d6
| 393242 ||  || — || June 14, 2007 || Kitt Peak || Spacewatch || — || align=right | 3.8 km || 
|-id=243 bgcolor=#E9E9E9
| 393243 ||  || — || December 5, 1996 || Kitt Peak || Spacewatch || PAD || align=right | 1.7 km || 
|-id=244 bgcolor=#d6d6d6
| 393244 ||  || — || February 21, 2006 || Mount Lemmon || Mount Lemmon Survey || EOS || align=right | 1.7 km || 
|-id=245 bgcolor=#fefefe
| 393245 ||  || — || January 23, 1998 || Kitt Peak || Spacewatch || FLO || align=right data-sort-value="0.64" | 640 m || 
|-id=246 bgcolor=#d6d6d6
| 393246 ||  || — || October 7, 2008 || Mount Lemmon || Mount Lemmon Survey || Tj (2.99) || align=right | 3.9 km || 
|-id=247 bgcolor=#fefefe
| 393247 ||  || — || August 16, 2002 || Kitt Peak || Spacewatch || — || align=right data-sort-value="0.73" | 730 m || 
|-id=248 bgcolor=#d6d6d6
| 393248 ||  || — || January 20, 2009 || Catalina || CSS || — || align=right | 2.2 km || 
|-id=249 bgcolor=#E9E9E9
| 393249 ||  || — || July 3, 2003 || Kitt Peak || Spacewatch || JUN || align=right | 1.9 km || 
|-id=250 bgcolor=#d6d6d6
| 393250 ||  || — || October 27, 2003 || Kitt Peak || Spacewatch || — || align=right | 4.0 km || 
|-id=251 bgcolor=#d6d6d6
| 393251 ||  || — || August 7, 2008 || Kitt Peak || Spacewatch || KOR || align=right | 1.3 km || 
|-id=252 bgcolor=#d6d6d6
| 393252 ||  || — || January 16, 1999 || Kitt Peak || Spacewatch || — || align=right | 3.7 km || 
|-id=253 bgcolor=#E9E9E9
| 393253 ||  || — || December 3, 2005 || Catalina || CSS || — || align=right | 1.6 km || 
|-id=254 bgcolor=#E9E9E9
| 393254 ||  || — || April 6, 2008 || Mount Lemmon || Mount Lemmon Survey || — || align=right data-sort-value="0.89" | 890 m || 
|-id=255 bgcolor=#E9E9E9
| 393255 ||  || — || May 16, 2012 || Mount Lemmon || Mount Lemmon Survey || — || align=right | 2.0 km || 
|-id=256 bgcolor=#E9E9E9
| 393256 ||  || — || October 15, 1996 || Kitt Peak || Spacewatch || — || align=right | 2.0 km || 
|-id=257 bgcolor=#d6d6d6
| 393257 ||  || — || March 16, 2005 || Mount Lemmon || Mount Lemmon Survey || — || align=right | 3.1 km || 
|-id=258 bgcolor=#d6d6d6
| 393258 ||  || — || October 4, 2007 || Mount Lemmon || Mount Lemmon Survey || — || align=right | 2.9 km || 
|-id=259 bgcolor=#d6d6d6
| 393259 ||  || — || October 25, 2008 || Kitt Peak || Spacewatch || — || align=right | 3.6 km || 
|-id=260 bgcolor=#E9E9E9
| 393260 ||  || — || January 30, 2006 || Kitt Peak || Spacewatch || GEF || align=right | 1.4 km || 
|-id=261 bgcolor=#fefefe
| 393261 ||  || — || December 5, 2002 || Socorro || LINEAR || — || align=right data-sort-value="0.89" | 890 m || 
|-id=262 bgcolor=#d6d6d6
| 393262 ||  || — || December 5, 2002 || Socorro || LINEAR || EOS || align=right | 2.5 km || 
|-id=263 bgcolor=#d6d6d6
| 393263 ||  || — || October 20, 2006 || Mount Lemmon || Mount Lemmon Survey || HIL3:2 || align=right | 7.6 km || 
|-id=264 bgcolor=#fefefe
| 393264 ||  || — || October 2, 2006 || Mount Lemmon || Mount Lemmon Survey || — || align=right data-sort-value="0.67" | 670 m || 
|-id=265 bgcolor=#d6d6d6
| 393265 ||  || — || November 20, 2008 || Mount Lemmon || Mount Lemmon Survey || — || align=right | 3.5 km || 
|-id=266 bgcolor=#d6d6d6
| 393266 ||  || — || December 29, 2003 || Socorro || LINEAR || — || align=right | 4.4 km || 
|-id=267 bgcolor=#fefefe
| 393267 ||  || — || February 16, 2004 || Kitt Peak || Spacewatch || — || align=right data-sort-value="0.53" | 530 m || 
|-id=268 bgcolor=#E9E9E9
| 393268 ||  || — || February 20, 2010 || WISE || WISE || — || align=right | 3.8 km || 
|-id=269 bgcolor=#fefefe
| 393269 ||  || — || October 9, 1999 || Socorro || LINEAR || — || align=right data-sort-value="0.97" | 970 m || 
|-id=270 bgcolor=#E9E9E9
| 393270 ||  || — || August 20, 2000 || Kitt Peak || Spacewatch || — || align=right | 1.2 km || 
|-id=271 bgcolor=#E9E9E9
| 393271 ||  || — || January 6, 2010 || Kitt Peak || Spacewatch || PAD || align=right | 1.9 km || 
|-id=272 bgcolor=#d6d6d6
| 393272 ||  || — || December 19, 2003 || Kitt Peak || Spacewatch || EOS || align=right | 2.4 km || 
|-id=273 bgcolor=#E9E9E9
| 393273 ||  || — || August 5, 2008 || Siding Spring || SSS || — || align=right | 1.6 km || 
|-id=274 bgcolor=#E9E9E9
| 393274 ||  || — || December 7, 2005 || Kitt Peak || Spacewatch || — || align=right data-sort-value="0.83" | 830 m || 
|-id=275 bgcolor=#E9E9E9
| 393275 ||  || — || November 17, 1995 || Kitt Peak || Spacewatch || WIT || align=right | 1.2 km || 
|-id=276 bgcolor=#E9E9E9
| 393276 ||  || — || February 9, 2010 || Catalina || CSS || — || align=right | 3.4 km || 
|-id=277 bgcolor=#d6d6d6
| 393277 ||  || — || December 11, 2002 || Socorro || LINEAR || — || align=right | 4.5 km || 
|-id=278 bgcolor=#E9E9E9
| 393278 ||  || — || October 8, 2004 || Kitt Peak || Spacewatch || — || align=right | 1.5 km || 
|-id=279 bgcolor=#E9E9E9
| 393279 ||  || — || April 7, 2003 || Kitt Peak || Spacewatch || — || align=right | 1.9 km || 
|-id=280 bgcolor=#fefefe
| 393280 ||  || — || October 18, 2006 || Kitt Peak || Spacewatch || — || align=right data-sort-value="0.61" | 610 m || 
|-id=281 bgcolor=#E9E9E9
| 393281 ||  || — || September 23, 2008 || Mount Lemmon || Mount Lemmon Survey || — || align=right | 4.4 km || 
|-id=282 bgcolor=#E9E9E9
| 393282 ||  || — || February 4, 2006 || Catalina || CSS || EUN || align=right | 1.6 km || 
|-id=283 bgcolor=#E9E9E9
| 393283 ||  || — || November 27, 2009 || Mount Lemmon || Mount Lemmon Survey || — || align=right | 2.8 km || 
|-id=284 bgcolor=#d6d6d6
| 393284 ||  || — || March 3, 2005 || Catalina || CSS || KOR || align=right | 1.5 km || 
|-id=285 bgcolor=#E9E9E9
| 393285 ||  || — || May 11, 2003 || Kitt Peak || Spacewatch || EUN || align=right | 2.4 km || 
|-id=286 bgcolor=#E9E9E9
| 393286 ||  || — || September 21, 2004 || Anderson Mesa || LONEOS || — || align=right | 4.8 km || 
|-id=287 bgcolor=#d6d6d6
| 393287 ||  || — || December 19, 2003 || Kitt Peak || Spacewatch || — || align=right | 2.5 km || 
|-id=288 bgcolor=#E9E9E9
| 393288 ||  || — || February 16, 2010 || Kitt Peak || Spacewatch || PAD || align=right | 2.0 km || 
|-id=289 bgcolor=#fefefe
| 393289 ||  || — || February 28, 2008 || Kitt Peak || Spacewatch || — || align=right data-sort-value="0.67" | 670 m || 
|-id=290 bgcolor=#fefefe
| 393290 ||  || — || March 27, 2011 || Kitt Peak || Spacewatch || — || align=right data-sort-value="0.77" | 770 m || 
|-id=291 bgcolor=#d6d6d6
| 393291 ||  || — || February 12, 2004 || Kitt Peak || Spacewatch || EOS || align=right | 2.0 km || 
|-id=292 bgcolor=#d6d6d6
| 393292 ||  || — || May 25, 2006 || Mount Lemmon || Mount Lemmon Survey || — || align=right | 5.9 km || 
|-id=293 bgcolor=#fefefe
| 393293 ||  || — || February 9, 2007 || Kitt Peak || Spacewatch || — || align=right data-sort-value="0.81" | 810 m || 
|-id=294 bgcolor=#d6d6d6
| 393294 ||  || — || March 15, 2010 || Catalina || CSS || TRE || align=right | 3.6 km || 
|-id=295 bgcolor=#fefefe
| 393295 ||  || — || November 22, 2006 || Catalina || CSS || — || align=right data-sort-value="0.77" | 770 m || 
|-id=296 bgcolor=#d6d6d6
| 393296 ||  || — || September 17, 2006 || Kitt Peak || Spacewatch || — || align=right | 3.5 km || 
|-id=297 bgcolor=#E9E9E9
| 393297 ||  || — || August 23, 2008 || Siding Spring || SSS || — || align=right | 3.5 km || 
|-id=298 bgcolor=#fefefe
| 393298 ||  || — || December 17, 2001 || Socorro || LINEAR || NYS || align=right data-sort-value="0.72" | 720 m || 
|-id=299 bgcolor=#d6d6d6
| 393299 ||  || — || July 5, 2005 || Kitt Peak || Spacewatch || EOS || align=right | 2.5 km || 
|-id=300 bgcolor=#d6d6d6
| 393300 ||  || — || February 4, 2009 || Mount Lemmon || Mount Lemmon Survey || — || align=right | 5.1 km || 
|}

393301–393400 

|-bgcolor=#d6d6d6
| 393301 ||  || — || November 13, 2007 || Kitt Peak || Spacewatch || — || align=right | 3.2 km || 
|-id=302 bgcolor=#fefefe
| 393302 ||  || — || February 2, 2000 || Socorro || LINEAR || H || align=right | 1.1 km || 
|-id=303 bgcolor=#fefefe
| 393303 ||  || — || March 11, 2007 || Kitt Peak || Spacewatch || — || align=right | 1.1 km || 
|-id=304 bgcolor=#E9E9E9
| 393304 ||  || — || October 22, 1998 || Kitt Peak || Spacewatch || AGN || align=right | 1.4 km || 
|-id=305 bgcolor=#E9E9E9
| 393305 ||  || — || February 4, 2005 || Mount Lemmon || Mount Lemmon Survey || AGN || align=right | 1.3 km || 
|-id=306 bgcolor=#fefefe
| 393306 ||  || — || November 22, 2006 || Mount Lemmon || Mount Lemmon Survey || — || align=right data-sort-value="0.80" | 800 m || 
|-id=307 bgcolor=#E9E9E9
| 393307 ||  || — || March 9, 2002 || Kitt Peak || Spacewatch || — || align=right data-sort-value="0.75" | 750 m || 
|-id=308 bgcolor=#E9E9E9
| 393308 ||  || — || September 22, 2008 || Socorro || LINEAR || — || align=right | 1.2 km || 
|-id=309 bgcolor=#fefefe
| 393309 ||  || — || September 23, 2005 || Catalina || CSS || V || align=right data-sort-value="0.75" | 750 m || 
|-id=310 bgcolor=#fefefe
| 393310 ||  || — || April 26, 2003 || Kitt Peak || Spacewatch || — || align=right | 1.1 km || 
|-id=311 bgcolor=#d6d6d6
| 393311 ||  || — || March 13, 2010 || Siding Spring || SSS || TIR || align=right | 4.9 km || 
|-id=312 bgcolor=#fefefe
| 393312 ||  || — || November 24, 2006 || Kitt Peak || Spacewatch || — || align=right data-sort-value="0.83" | 830 m || 
|-id=313 bgcolor=#E9E9E9
| 393313 ||  || — || January 12, 2010 || WISE || WISE || — || align=right | 2.4 km || 
|-id=314 bgcolor=#d6d6d6
| 393314 ||  || — || December 5, 2005 || Mount Lemmon || Mount Lemmon Survey || 3:2 || align=right | 3.3 km || 
|-id=315 bgcolor=#d6d6d6
| 393315 ||  || — || January 29, 2010 || WISE || WISE || MRC || align=right | 2.9 km || 
|-id=316 bgcolor=#d6d6d6
| 393316 ||  || — || January 11, 2008 || Kitt Peak || Spacewatch || — || align=right | 3.4 km || 
|-id=317 bgcolor=#E9E9E9
| 393317 ||  || — || October 26, 2008 || Mount Lemmon || Mount Lemmon Survey || — || align=right | 2.6 km || 
|-id=318 bgcolor=#E9E9E9
| 393318 ||  || — || September 17, 2004 || Anderson Mesa || LONEOS || — || align=right | 1.5 km || 
|-id=319 bgcolor=#fefefe
| 393319 ||  || — || September 26, 2006 || Kitt Peak || Spacewatch || — || align=right data-sort-value="0.69" | 690 m || 
|-id=320 bgcolor=#fefefe
| 393320 ||  || — || October 5, 2005 || Mount Lemmon || Mount Lemmon Survey || ERI || align=right | 1.6 km || 
|-id=321 bgcolor=#d6d6d6
| 393321 ||  || — || August 24, 2007 || Kitt Peak || Spacewatch || — || align=right | 2.1 km || 
|-id=322 bgcolor=#E9E9E9
| 393322 ||  || — || March 2, 2006 || Kitt Peak || Spacewatch || — || align=right | 1.1 km || 
|-id=323 bgcolor=#E9E9E9
| 393323 ||  || — || February 16, 2001 || Socorro || LINEAR || EUN || align=right | 1.6 km || 
|-id=324 bgcolor=#E9E9E9
| 393324 ||  || — || November 23, 2008 || Kitt Peak || Spacewatch || AGN || align=right | 1.3 km || 
|-id=325 bgcolor=#fefefe
| 393325 ||  || — || December 18, 2009 || Mount Lemmon || Mount Lemmon Survey || — || align=right data-sort-value="0.85" | 850 m || 
|-id=326 bgcolor=#E9E9E9
| 393326 ||  || — || January 25, 2006 || Kitt Peak || Spacewatch || — || align=right | 2.2 km || 
|-id=327 bgcolor=#d6d6d6
| 393327 ||  || — || May 12, 2010 || Mount Lemmon || Mount Lemmon Survey || EOS || align=right | 2.0 km || 
|-id=328 bgcolor=#fefefe
| 393328 ||  || — || April 25, 2003 || Kitt Peak || Spacewatch || NYS || align=right data-sort-value="0.79" | 790 m || 
|-id=329 bgcolor=#fefefe
| 393329 ||  || — || November 14, 2006 || Mount Lemmon || Mount Lemmon Survey || — || align=right data-sort-value="0.62" | 620 m || 
|-id=330 bgcolor=#fefefe
| 393330 ||  || — || March 26, 2003 || Kitt Peak || Spacewatch || — || align=right data-sort-value="0.87" | 870 m || 
|-id=331 bgcolor=#fefefe
| 393331 ||  || — || February 23, 2007 || Kitt Peak || Spacewatch || — || align=right data-sort-value="0.69" | 690 m || 
|-id=332 bgcolor=#fefefe
| 393332 ||  || — || February 23, 2007 || Kitt Peak || Spacewatch || NYS || align=right data-sort-value="0.74" | 740 m || 
|-id=333 bgcolor=#fefefe
| 393333 ||  || — || December 12, 2006 || Mount Lemmon || Mount Lemmon Survey || NYS || align=right data-sort-value="0.59" | 590 m || 
|-id=334 bgcolor=#d6d6d6
| 393334 ||  || — || March 9, 2005 || Kitt Peak || Spacewatch || CHA || align=right | 2.5 km || 
|-id=335 bgcolor=#E9E9E9
| 393335 ||  || — || February 1, 2005 || Kitt Peak || Spacewatch || — || align=right | 2.6 km || 
|-id=336 bgcolor=#d6d6d6
| 393336 ||  || — || September 19, 2006 || Kitt Peak || Spacewatch || — || align=right | 2.5 km || 
|-id=337 bgcolor=#E9E9E9
| 393337 ||  || — || February 23, 2006 || Anderson Mesa || LONEOS || — || align=right | 1.7 km || 
|-id=338 bgcolor=#E9E9E9
| 393338 ||  || — || January 31, 2010 || WISE || WISE || — || align=right | 1.9 km || 
|-id=339 bgcolor=#fefefe
| 393339 ||  || — || January 16, 2004 || Kitt Peak || Spacewatch || — || align=right data-sort-value="0.57" | 570 m || 
|-id=340 bgcolor=#fefefe
| 393340 ||  || — || November 30, 2005 || Kitt Peak || Spacewatch || MAS || align=right data-sort-value="0.82" | 820 m || 
|-id=341 bgcolor=#fefefe
| 393341 ||  || — || October 1, 2008 || Kitt Peak || Spacewatch || NYS || align=right data-sort-value="0.93" | 930 m || 
|-id=342 bgcolor=#E9E9E9
| 393342 ||  || — || February 2, 2005 || Kitt Peak || Spacewatch || — || align=right | 3.4 km || 
|-id=343 bgcolor=#d6d6d6
| 393343 ||  || — || January 3, 2009 || Mount Lemmon || Mount Lemmon Survey || — || align=right | 3.6 km || 
|-id=344 bgcolor=#fefefe
| 393344 ||  || — || May 8, 2011 || Kitt Peak || Spacewatch || V || align=right data-sort-value="0.59" | 590 m || 
|-id=345 bgcolor=#d6d6d6
| 393345 ||  || — || October 7, 2000 || Kitt Peak || Spacewatch || — || align=right | 3.0 km || 
|-id=346 bgcolor=#fefefe
| 393346 || 4329 P-L || — || September 24, 1960 || Palomar || PLS || — || align=right data-sort-value="0.68" | 680 m || 
|-id=347 bgcolor=#d6d6d6
| 393347 ||  || — || September 24, 1960 || Palomar || PLS || — || align=right | 2.6 km || 
|-id=348 bgcolor=#FA8072
| 393348 ||  || — || September 13, 1988 || Palomar || C. S. Shoemaker || unusual || align=right | 1.5 km || 
|-id=349 bgcolor=#fefefe
| 393349 ||  || — || November 4, 1991 || Kitt Peak || Spacewatch || — || align=right | 1.0 km || 
|-id=350 bgcolor=#B88A00
| 393350 ||  || — || September 1, 1992 || Palomar || E. F. Helin, K. J. Lawrence || unusual || align=right | 2.5 km || 
|-id=351 bgcolor=#d6d6d6
| 393351 ||  || — || October 9, 1993 || La Silla || E. W. Elst || — || align=right | 2.9 km || 
|-id=352 bgcolor=#fefefe
| 393352 ||  || — || July 23, 1995 || Kitt Peak || Spacewatch || — || align=right data-sort-value="0.82" | 820 m || 
|-id=353 bgcolor=#E9E9E9
| 393353 ||  || — || October 17, 1995 || Kitt Peak || Spacewatch || MAR || align=right | 1.6 km || 
|-id=354 bgcolor=#d6d6d6
| 393354 ||  || — || October 19, 1995 || Kitt Peak || Spacewatch || EOS || align=right | 2.7 km || 
|-id=355 bgcolor=#d6d6d6
| 393355 ||  || — || October 19, 1995 || Kitt Peak || Spacewatch || — || align=right | 2.8 km || 
|-id=356 bgcolor=#fefefe
| 393356 ||  || — || March 11, 1996 || Kitt Peak || Spacewatch || — || align=right data-sort-value="0.70" | 700 m || 
|-id=357 bgcolor=#fefefe
| 393357 ||  || — || January 31, 1997 || Kitt Peak || Spacewatch || — || align=right data-sort-value="0.62" | 620 m || 
|-id=358 bgcolor=#fefefe
| 393358 ||  || — || October 3, 1997 || Caussols || ODAS || NYS || align=right data-sort-value="0.79" | 790 m || 
|-id=359 bgcolor=#FFC2E0
| 393359 ||  || — || June 19, 1998 || Socorro || LINEAR || AMOcritical || align=right data-sort-value="0.77" | 770 m || 
|-id=360 bgcolor=#E9E9E9
| 393360 ||  || — || October 14, 1998 || Kitt Peak || Spacewatch || — || align=right | 1.4 km || 
|-id=361 bgcolor=#d6d6d6
| 393361 ||  || — || March 10, 1999 || Kitt Peak || Spacewatch || — || align=right | 2.9 km || 
|-id=362 bgcolor=#fefefe
| 393362 ||  || — || March 21, 1999 || Kitt Peak || Spacewatch || MAS || align=right data-sort-value="0.84" | 840 m || 
|-id=363 bgcolor=#fefefe
| 393363 ||  || — || April 11, 1999 || Kitt Peak || Spacewatch || V || align=right data-sort-value="0.72" | 720 m || 
|-id=364 bgcolor=#FA8072
| 393364 ||  || — || September 5, 1999 || Catalina || CSS || — || align=right | 1.2 km || 
|-id=365 bgcolor=#fefefe
| 393365 ||  || — || September 12, 1999 || Bergisch Gladbach || W. Bickel || — || align=right data-sort-value="0.57" | 570 m || 
|-id=366 bgcolor=#E9E9E9
| 393366 ||  || — || October 9, 1999 || Kitt Peak || Spacewatch || MAR || align=right | 2.0 km || 
|-id=367 bgcolor=#d6d6d6
| 393367 ||  || — || October 7, 1999 || Kitt Peak || Spacewatch || — || align=right | 2.5 km || 
|-id=368 bgcolor=#fefefe
| 393368 ||  || — || October 6, 1999 || Socorro || LINEAR || — || align=right data-sort-value="0.68" | 680 m || 
|-id=369 bgcolor=#d6d6d6
| 393369 ||  || — || October 9, 1999 || Catalina || CSS || — || align=right | 2.7 km || 
|-id=370 bgcolor=#E9E9E9
| 393370 ||  || — || October 9, 1999 || Kitt Peak || Spacewatch || — || align=right | 1.5 km || 
|-id=371 bgcolor=#d6d6d6
| 393371 ||  || — || October 10, 1999 || Socorro || LINEAR || TIR || align=right | 3.7 km || 
|-id=372 bgcolor=#d6d6d6
| 393372 ||  || — || October 12, 1999 || Kitt Peak || Spacewatch || — || align=right | 2.7 km || 
|-id=373 bgcolor=#E9E9E9
| 393373 ||  || — || November 3, 1999 || Socorro || LINEAR || BAR || align=right | 2.6 km || 
|-id=374 bgcolor=#d6d6d6
| 393374 ||  || — || November 3, 1999 || Kitt Peak || Spacewatch || — || align=right | 2.6 km || 
|-id=375 bgcolor=#fefefe
| 393375 ||  || — || October 10, 1999 || Socorro || LINEAR || — || align=right data-sort-value="0.82" | 820 m || 
|-id=376 bgcolor=#d6d6d6
| 393376 ||  || — || November 4, 1999 || Kitt Peak || Spacewatch || — || align=right | 2.5 km || 
|-id=377 bgcolor=#fefefe
| 393377 ||  || — || November 12, 1999 || Socorro || LINEAR || — || align=right data-sort-value="0.87" | 870 m || 
|-id=378 bgcolor=#d6d6d6
| 393378 ||  || — || November 9, 1999 || Kitt Peak || Spacewatch || — || align=right | 3.3 km || 
|-id=379 bgcolor=#E9E9E9
| 393379 ||  || — || December 7, 1999 || Socorro || LINEAR || — || align=right | 1.2 km || 
|-id=380 bgcolor=#E9E9E9
| 393380 ||  || — || January 6, 2000 || Kitt Peak || Spacewatch || — || align=right | 1.4 km || 
|-id=381 bgcolor=#fefefe
| 393381 ||  || — || January 8, 2000 || Kitt Peak || Spacewatch || — || align=right data-sort-value="0.87" | 870 m || 
|-id=382 bgcolor=#E9E9E9
| 393382 ||  || — || January 26, 2000 || Kitt Peak || Spacewatch || — || align=right | 1.8 km || 
|-id=383 bgcolor=#E9E9E9
| 393383 ||  || — || January 26, 2000 || Kitt Peak || Spacewatch || — || align=right | 1.5 km || 
|-id=384 bgcolor=#E9E9E9
| 393384 ||  || — || March 25, 2000 || Kitt Peak || Spacewatch || — || align=right | 1.9 km || 
|-id=385 bgcolor=#E9E9E9
| 393385 ||  || — || April 5, 2000 || Socorro || LINEAR || — || align=right | 1.9 km || 
|-id=386 bgcolor=#E9E9E9
| 393386 ||  || — || April 6, 2000 || Kitt Peak || Spacewatch || — || align=right | 2.0 km || 
|-id=387 bgcolor=#fefefe
| 393387 ||  || — || April 29, 2000 || Socorro || LINEAR || — || align=right | 2.9 km || 
|-id=388 bgcolor=#fefefe
| 393388 ||  || — || July 30, 2000 || Cerro Tololo || M. W. Buie || — || align=right | 1.0 km || 
|-id=389 bgcolor=#d6d6d6
| 393389 ||  || — || August 24, 2000 || Socorro || LINEAR || — || align=right | 2.5 km || 
|-id=390 bgcolor=#d6d6d6
| 393390 ||  || — || August 24, 2000 || Socorro || LINEAR || critical || align=right | 2.2 km || 
|-id=391 bgcolor=#fefefe
| 393391 ||  || — || August 31, 2000 || Socorro || LINEAR || — || align=right data-sort-value="0.94" | 940 m || 
|-id=392 bgcolor=#d6d6d6
| 393392 ||  || — || August 29, 2000 || Socorro || LINEAR || — || align=right | 2.1 km || 
|-id=393 bgcolor=#FA8072
| 393393 ||  || — || September 1, 2000 || Socorro || LINEAR || — || align=right data-sort-value="0.98" | 980 m || 
|-id=394 bgcolor=#fefefe
| 393394 ||  || — || August 31, 2000 || Socorro || LINEAR || — || align=right data-sort-value="0.86" | 860 m || 
|-id=395 bgcolor=#d6d6d6
| 393395 ||  || — || September 21, 2000 || Anderson Mesa || LONEOS || — || align=right | 3.2 km || 
|-id=396 bgcolor=#fefefe
| 393396 ||  || — || September 24, 2000 || Socorro || LINEAR || — || align=right data-sort-value="0.86" | 860 m || 
|-id=397 bgcolor=#fefefe
| 393397 ||  || — || September 22, 2000 || Anderson Mesa || LONEOS || — || align=right | 1.0 km || 
|-id=398 bgcolor=#fefefe
| 393398 ||  || — || September 24, 2000 || Socorro || LINEAR || — || align=right | 1.1 km || 
|-id=399 bgcolor=#fefefe
| 393399 ||  || — || November 2, 2000 || Socorro || LINEAR || — || align=right | 1.2 km || 
|-id=400 bgcolor=#fefefe
| 393400 ||  || — || November 17, 2000 || Kitt Peak || Spacewatch || — || align=right data-sort-value="0.76" | 760 m || 
|}

393401–393500 

|-bgcolor=#d6d6d6
| 393401 ||  || — || October 1, 2000 || Socorro || LINEAR || — || align=right | 2.5 km || 
|-id=402 bgcolor=#fefefe
| 393402 ||  || — || November 29, 2000 || Haleakala || NEAT || — || align=right | 1.2 km || 
|-id=403 bgcolor=#fefefe
| 393403 ||  || — || November 30, 2000 || Socorro || LINEAR || — || align=right | 1.2 km || 
|-id=404 bgcolor=#E9E9E9
| 393404 ||  || — || December 6, 2000 || Kitt Peak || Spacewatch || — || align=right | 1.6 km || 
|-id=405 bgcolor=#E9E9E9
| 393405 ||  || — || December 30, 2000 || Socorro || LINEAR || — || align=right | 1.8 km || 
|-id=406 bgcolor=#E9E9E9
| 393406 ||  || — || December 30, 2000 || Socorro || LINEAR || — || align=right data-sort-value="0.83" | 830 m || 
|-id=407 bgcolor=#E9E9E9
| 393407 ||  || — || January 15, 2001 || Socorro || LINEAR || — || align=right | 2.3 km || 
|-id=408 bgcolor=#E9E9E9
| 393408 ||  || — || January 21, 2001 || Socorro || LINEAR || — || align=right | 1.3 km || 
|-id=409 bgcolor=#E9E9E9
| 393409 ||  || — || February 4, 2001 || Socorro || LINEAR || — || align=right | 2.0 km || 
|-id=410 bgcolor=#FA8072
| 393410 ||  || — || May 17, 2001 || Socorro || LINEAR || — || align=right | 2.9 km || 
|-id=411 bgcolor=#E9E9E9
| 393411 ||  || — || July 18, 2001 || Haleakala || NEAT || — || align=right | 2.5 km || 
|-id=412 bgcolor=#E9E9E9
| 393412 ||  || — || August 16, 2001 || Socorro || LINEAR || — || align=right | 3.1 km || 
|-id=413 bgcolor=#FA8072
| 393413 ||  || — || August 19, 2001 || Socorro || LINEAR || — || align=right data-sort-value="0.71" | 710 m || 
|-id=414 bgcolor=#E9E9E9
| 393414 ||  || — || August 24, 2001 || Ondřejov || P. Kušnirák, P. Pravec || — || align=right | 2.0 km || 
|-id=415 bgcolor=#fefefe
| 393415 ||  || — || August 22, 2001 || Socorro || LINEAR || — || align=right | 1.1 km || 
|-id=416 bgcolor=#fefefe
| 393416 ||  || — || August 25, 2001 || Kitt Peak || Spacewatch || — || align=right data-sort-value="0.82" | 820 m || 
|-id=417 bgcolor=#FA8072
| 393417 ||  || — || August 27, 2001 || Palomar || NEAT || — || align=right | 1.1 km || 
|-id=418 bgcolor=#fefefe
| 393418 ||  || — || August 24, 2001 || Haleakala || NEAT || V || align=right | 1.2 km || 
|-id=419 bgcolor=#E9E9E9
| 393419 ||  || — || September 7, 2001 || Socorro || LINEAR || — || align=right | 2.3 km || 
|-id=420 bgcolor=#fefefe
| 393420 ||  || — || September 9, 2001 || Goodricke-Pigott || R. A. Tucker || — || align=right data-sort-value="0.87" | 870 m || 
|-id=421 bgcolor=#fefefe
| 393421 ||  || — || September 12, 2001 || Socorro || LINEAR || — || align=right data-sort-value="0.82" | 820 m || 
|-id=422 bgcolor=#fefefe
| 393422 ||  || — || September 11, 2001 || Anderson Mesa || LONEOS || — || align=right data-sort-value="0.84" | 840 m || 
|-id=423 bgcolor=#fefefe
| 393423 ||  || — || September 18, 2001 || Kitt Peak || Spacewatch || — || align=right data-sort-value="0.98" | 980 m || 
|-id=424 bgcolor=#fefefe
| 393424 ||  || — || September 17, 2001 || Socorro || LINEAR || NYS || align=right data-sort-value="0.77" | 770 m || 
|-id=425 bgcolor=#fefefe
| 393425 ||  || — || September 20, 2001 || Socorro || LINEAR || — || align=right | 1.0 km || 
|-id=426 bgcolor=#fefefe
| 393426 ||  || — || September 16, 2001 || Socorro || LINEAR || — || align=right data-sort-value="0.94" | 940 m || 
|-id=427 bgcolor=#fefefe
| 393427 ||  || — || September 16, 2001 || Socorro || LINEAR || — || align=right | 1.1 km || 
|-id=428 bgcolor=#E9E9E9
| 393428 ||  || — || September 16, 2001 || Socorro || LINEAR || DOR || align=right | 3.3 km || 
|-id=429 bgcolor=#fefefe
| 393429 ||  || — || September 17, 2001 || Socorro || LINEAR || — || align=right data-sort-value="0.73" | 730 m || 
|-id=430 bgcolor=#fefefe
| 393430 ||  || — || September 19, 2001 || Socorro || LINEAR || — || align=right | 1.1 km || 
|-id=431 bgcolor=#d6d6d6
| 393431 ||  || — || September 19, 2001 || Socorro || LINEAR || — || align=right | 2.4 km || 
|-id=432 bgcolor=#fefefe
| 393432 ||  || — || September 19, 2001 || Socorro || LINEAR || — || align=right data-sort-value="0.91" | 910 m || 
|-id=433 bgcolor=#fefefe
| 393433 ||  || — || September 16, 2001 || Socorro || LINEAR || — || align=right | 1.0 km || 
|-id=434 bgcolor=#fefefe
| 393434 ||  || — || September 20, 2001 || Socorro || LINEAR || — || align=right data-sort-value="0.78" | 780 m || 
|-id=435 bgcolor=#fefefe
| 393435 ||  || — || September 23, 2001 || Socorro || LINEAR || — || align=right data-sort-value="0.78" | 780 m || 
|-id=436 bgcolor=#E9E9E9
| 393436 ||  || — || September 25, 2001 || Socorro || LINEAR || — || align=right | 1.7 km || 
|-id=437 bgcolor=#E9E9E9
| 393437 ||  || — || September 19, 2001 || Socorro || LINEAR || DOR || align=right | 1.8 km || 
|-id=438 bgcolor=#fefefe
| 393438 ||  || — || September 19, 2001 || Socorro || LINEAR || — || align=right data-sort-value="0.65" | 650 m || 
|-id=439 bgcolor=#E9E9E9
| 393439 ||  || — || October 15, 2001 || Socorro || LINEAR || — || align=right | 4.3 km || 
|-id=440 bgcolor=#d6d6d6
| 393440 ||  || — || October 10, 2001 || Palomar || NEAT || — || align=right | 2.9 km || 
|-id=441 bgcolor=#fefefe
| 393441 ||  || — || October 11, 2001 || Palomar || NEAT || — || align=right data-sort-value="0.83" | 830 m || 
|-id=442 bgcolor=#E9E9E9
| 393442 ||  || — || October 11, 2001 || Socorro || LINEAR || — || align=right | 2.2 km || 
|-id=443 bgcolor=#fefefe
| 393443 ||  || — || October 11, 2001 || Socorro || LINEAR || — || align=right data-sort-value="0.98" | 980 m || 
|-id=444 bgcolor=#fefefe
| 393444 ||  || — || October 11, 2001 || Socorro || LINEAR || — || align=right data-sort-value="0.86" | 860 m || 
|-id=445 bgcolor=#fefefe
| 393445 ||  || — || October 12, 2001 || Anderson Mesa || LONEOS || — || align=right data-sort-value="0.86" | 860 m || 
|-id=446 bgcolor=#FA8072
| 393446 ||  || — || October 15, 2001 || Palomar || NEAT || — || align=right data-sort-value="0.96" | 960 m || 
|-id=447 bgcolor=#fefefe
| 393447 ||  || — || October 13, 2001 || Kitt Peak || Spacewatch || H || align=right data-sort-value="0.68" | 680 m || 
|-id=448 bgcolor=#fefefe
| 393448 ||  || — || October 17, 2001 || Socorro || LINEAR || — || align=right data-sort-value="0.82" | 820 m || 
|-id=449 bgcolor=#E9E9E9
| 393449 ||  || — || October 22, 2001 || Palomar || NEAT || — || align=right | 2.7 km || 
|-id=450 bgcolor=#fefefe
| 393450 ||  || — || October 22, 2001 || Socorro || LINEAR || MAS || align=right data-sort-value="0.82" | 820 m || 
|-id=451 bgcolor=#E9E9E9
| 393451 ||  || — || October 23, 2001 || Palomar || NEAT || — || align=right | 2.4 km || 
|-id=452 bgcolor=#fefefe
| 393452 ||  || — || October 18, 2001 || Socorro || LINEAR || — || align=right | 1.2 km || 
|-id=453 bgcolor=#E9E9E9
| 393453 ||  || — || October 20, 2001 || Socorro || LINEAR || — || align=right | 2.2 km || 
|-id=454 bgcolor=#fefefe
| 393454 ||  || — || October 16, 2001 || Palomar || NEAT || — || align=right data-sort-value="0.67" | 670 m || 
|-id=455 bgcolor=#fefefe
| 393455 ||  || — || November 9, 2001 || Socorro || LINEAR || — || align=right data-sort-value="0.78" | 780 m || 
|-id=456 bgcolor=#fefefe
| 393456 ||  || — || November 11, 2001 || Socorro || LINEAR || PHO || align=right | 1.1 km || 
|-id=457 bgcolor=#fefefe
| 393457 ||  || — || November 14, 2001 || Kitt Peak || Spacewatch || V || align=right data-sort-value="0.97" | 970 m || 
|-id=458 bgcolor=#FA8072
| 393458 ||  || — || November 17, 2001 || Socorro || LINEAR || — || align=right | 1.1 km || 
|-id=459 bgcolor=#fefefe
| 393459 ||  || — || November 17, 2001 || Socorro || LINEAR || — || align=right | 1.0 km || 
|-id=460 bgcolor=#fefefe
| 393460 ||  || — || December 10, 2001 || Socorro || LINEAR || — || align=right | 1.1 km || 
|-id=461 bgcolor=#fefefe
| 393461 ||  || — || December 14, 2001 || Socorro || LINEAR || V || align=right | 1.2 km || 
|-id=462 bgcolor=#fefefe
| 393462 ||  || — || December 15, 2001 || Socorro || LINEAR || — || align=right data-sort-value="0.90" | 900 m || 
|-id=463 bgcolor=#d6d6d6
| 393463 ||  || — || December 17, 2001 || Socorro || LINEAR || — || align=right | 2.5 km || 
|-id=464 bgcolor=#d6d6d6
| 393464 ||  || — || October 14, 2001 || Socorro || LINEAR || — || align=right | 4.3 km || 
|-id=465 bgcolor=#fefefe
| 393465 ||  || — || December 18, 2001 || Socorro || LINEAR || — || align=right data-sort-value="0.67" | 670 m || 
|-id=466 bgcolor=#d6d6d6
| 393466 ||  || — || January 9, 2002 || Socorro || LINEAR || — || align=right | 3.2 km || 
|-id=467 bgcolor=#fefefe
| 393467 ||  || — || January 13, 2002 || Socorro || LINEAR || V || align=right data-sort-value="0.98" | 980 m || 
|-id=468 bgcolor=#fefefe
| 393468 ||  || — || January 12, 2002 || Palomar || NEAT || — || align=right data-sort-value="0.58" | 580 m || 
|-id=469 bgcolor=#fefefe
| 393469 ||  || — || January 13, 2002 || Kitt Peak || Spacewatch || V || align=right | 1.4 km || 
|-id=470 bgcolor=#d6d6d6
| 393470 ||  || — || February 7, 2002 || Socorro || LINEAR || — || align=right | 2.7 km || 
|-id=471 bgcolor=#d6d6d6
| 393471 ||  || — || February 10, 2002 || Socorro || LINEAR || — || align=right | 3.5 km || 
|-id=472 bgcolor=#d6d6d6
| 393472 ||  || — || January 14, 2002 || Kitt Peak || Spacewatch || — || align=right | 3.4 km || 
|-id=473 bgcolor=#d6d6d6
| 393473 ||  || — || January 13, 2002 || Kitt Peak || Spacewatch || — || align=right | 2.8 km || 
|-id=474 bgcolor=#C2FFFF
| 393474 ||  || — || March 6, 2002 || Palomar || NEAT || L4 || align=right | 11 km || 
|-id=475 bgcolor=#E9E9E9
| 393475 ||  || — || April 12, 2002 || Socorro || LINEAR || — || align=right data-sort-value="0.92" | 920 m || 
|-id=476 bgcolor=#d6d6d6
| 393476 ||  || — || March 12, 2002 || Kitt Peak || Spacewatch || — || align=right | 3.0 km || 
|-id=477 bgcolor=#E9E9E9
| 393477 ||  || — || May 1, 2002 || Palomar || NEAT || — || align=right | 1.3 km || 
|-id=478 bgcolor=#E9E9E9
| 393478 ||  || — || May 10, 2002 || Palomar || NEAT || — || align=right | 1.5 km || 
|-id=479 bgcolor=#E9E9E9
| 393479 ||  || — || June 28, 2002 || Palomar || NEAT || — || align=right | 1.6 km || 
|-id=480 bgcolor=#E9E9E9
| 393480 ||  || — || June 24, 2002 || Palomar || NEAT || — || align=right data-sort-value="0.94" | 940 m || 
|-id=481 bgcolor=#E9E9E9
| 393481 ||  || — || July 9, 2002 || Socorro || LINEAR || EUN || align=right | 1.3 km || 
|-id=482 bgcolor=#E9E9E9
| 393482 ||  || — || August 4, 2002 || Reedy Creek || J. Broughton || — || align=right | 2.0 km || 
|-id=483 bgcolor=#FA8072
| 393483 ||  || — || August 10, 2002 || Socorro || LINEAR || — || align=right | 1.7 km || 
|-id=484 bgcolor=#E9E9E9
| 393484 ||  || — || August 12, 2002 || Socorro || LINEAR || — || align=right | 1.1 km || 
|-id=485 bgcolor=#E9E9E9
| 393485 ||  || — || August 4, 2002 || Palomar || NEAT || — || align=right | 1.8 km || 
|-id=486 bgcolor=#E9E9E9
| 393486 ||  || — || August 11, 2002 || Palomar || NEAT || — || align=right | 1.5 km || 
|-id=487 bgcolor=#E9E9E9
| 393487 ||  || — || August 10, 2002 || Socorro || LINEAR || — || align=right | 2.6 km || 
|-id=488 bgcolor=#E9E9E9
| 393488 ||  || — || August 14, 2002 || Socorro || LINEAR || — || align=right | 1.1 km || 
|-id=489 bgcolor=#E9E9E9
| 393489 ||  || — || August 7, 2002 || Palomar || NEAT || — || align=right | 1.8 km || 
|-id=490 bgcolor=#E9E9E9
| 393490 ||  || — || August 8, 2002 || Palomar || NEAT || — || align=right | 1.4 km || 
|-id=491 bgcolor=#E9E9E9
| 393491 ||  || — || August 15, 2002 || Palomar || NEAT || — || align=right | 1.4 km || 
|-id=492 bgcolor=#E9E9E9
| 393492 ||  || — || August 25, 2002 || Palomar || NEAT || — || align=right data-sort-value="0.90" | 900 m || 
|-id=493 bgcolor=#E9E9E9
| 393493 ||  || — || August 28, 2002 || Socorro || LINEAR || — || align=right | 2.2 km || 
|-id=494 bgcolor=#E9E9E9
| 393494 ||  || — || August 31, 2002 || Needville || Needville Obs. || BRG || align=right | 1.1 km || 
|-id=495 bgcolor=#E9E9E9
| 393495 ||  || — || August 30, 2002 || Palomar || NEAT || — || align=right | 2.4 km || 
|-id=496 bgcolor=#E9E9E9
| 393496 ||  || — || August 19, 2002 || Palomar || NEAT || — || align=right | 1.3 km || 
|-id=497 bgcolor=#E9E9E9
| 393497 ||  || — || August 19, 2002 || Palomar || NEAT || WIT || align=right | 2.0 km || 
|-id=498 bgcolor=#E9E9E9
| 393498 ||  || — || August 29, 2002 || Palomar || NEAT || — || align=right | 1.4 km || 
|-id=499 bgcolor=#E9E9E9
| 393499 ||  || — || October 22, 1998 || Caussols || ODAS || — || align=right | 1.4 km || 
|-id=500 bgcolor=#E9E9E9
| 393500 ||  || — || September 4, 2002 || Anderson Mesa || LONEOS || — || align=right | 1.8 km || 
|}

393501–393600 

|-bgcolor=#E9E9E9
| 393501 ||  || — || August 31, 2002 || Kitt Peak || Spacewatch || (5) || align=right | 1.5 km || 
|-id=502 bgcolor=#E9E9E9
| 393502 ||  || — || September 5, 2002 || Socorro || LINEAR || — || align=right | 1.9 km || 
|-id=503 bgcolor=#E9E9E9
| 393503 ||  || — || September 5, 2002 || Socorro || LINEAR || — || align=right | 1.6 km || 
|-id=504 bgcolor=#FA8072
| 393504 ||  || — || September 10, 2002 || Palomar || NEAT || — || align=right data-sort-value="0.70" | 700 m || 
|-id=505 bgcolor=#E9E9E9
| 393505 ||  || — || September 10, 2002 || Haleakala || NEAT || MAR || align=right | 1.9 km || 
|-id=506 bgcolor=#E9E9E9
| 393506 ||  || — || September 12, 2002 || Palomar || NEAT || — || align=right | 1.6 km || 
|-id=507 bgcolor=#fefefe
| 393507 ||  || — || September 13, 2002 || Palomar || NEAT || — || align=right data-sort-value="0.76" | 760 m || 
|-id=508 bgcolor=#E9E9E9
| 393508 ||  || — || September 5, 2002 || Socorro || LINEAR || — || align=right data-sort-value="0.97" | 970 m || 
|-id=509 bgcolor=#E9E9E9
| 393509 ||  || — || September 16, 2002 || Palomar || NEAT || — || align=right | 1.7 km || 
|-id=510 bgcolor=#E9E9E9
| 393510 ||  || — || September 27, 2002 || Palomar || NEAT || — || align=right | 1.9 km || 
|-id=511 bgcolor=#E9E9E9
| 393511 ||  || — || September 27, 2002 || Needville || Needville Obs. || — || align=right | 1.4 km || 
|-id=512 bgcolor=#E9E9E9
| 393512 ||  || — || September 26, 2002 || Palomar || NEAT || — || align=right | 1.7 km || 
|-id=513 bgcolor=#E9E9E9
| 393513 ||  || — || September 30, 2002 || Socorro || LINEAR || — || align=right | 1.8 km || 
|-id=514 bgcolor=#E9E9E9
| 393514 ||  || — || September 30, 2002 || Socorro || LINEAR || EUN || align=right | 2.3 km || 
|-id=515 bgcolor=#E9E9E9
| 393515 ||  || — || September 16, 2002 || Palomar || NEAT || — || align=right | 1.9 km || 
|-id=516 bgcolor=#E9E9E9
| 393516 ||  || — || October 2, 2002 || Socorro || LINEAR || DOR || align=right | 2.7 km || 
|-id=517 bgcolor=#E9E9E9
| 393517 ||  || — || October 2, 2002 || Socorro || LINEAR || — || align=right | 1.9 km || 
|-id=518 bgcolor=#fefefe
| 393518 ||  || — || October 2, 2002 || Socorro || LINEAR || — || align=right | 1.1 km || 
|-id=519 bgcolor=#E9E9E9
| 393519 ||  || — || October 2, 2002 || Haleakala || NEAT || — || align=right | 1.6 km || 
|-id=520 bgcolor=#E9E9E9
| 393520 ||  || — || September 6, 2002 || Socorro || LINEAR || JUN || align=right | 1.6 km || 
|-id=521 bgcolor=#fefefe
| 393521 ||  || — || October 3, 2002 || Socorro || LINEAR || — || align=right data-sort-value="0.59" | 590 m || 
|-id=522 bgcolor=#E9E9E9
| 393522 ||  || — || October 2, 2002 || Campo Imperatore || CINEOS || — || align=right | 2.1 km || 
|-id=523 bgcolor=#E9E9E9
| 393523 ||  || — || August 30, 2002 || Anderson Mesa || LONEOS || — || align=right | 1.9 km || 
|-id=524 bgcolor=#E9E9E9
| 393524 ||  || — || October 5, 2002 || Palomar || NEAT || — || align=right | 1.7 km || 
|-id=525 bgcolor=#E9E9E9
| 393525 ||  || — || October 5, 2002 || Palomar || NEAT || JUN || align=right | 2.8 km || 
|-id=526 bgcolor=#FA8072
| 393526 ||  || — || October 5, 2002 || Socorro || LINEAR || — || align=right | 1.2 km || 
|-id=527 bgcolor=#E9E9E9
| 393527 ||  || — || October 4, 2002 || Socorro || LINEAR || — || align=right | 2.5 km || 
|-id=528 bgcolor=#E9E9E9
| 393528 ||  || — || October 3, 2002 || Palomar || NEAT || EUN || align=right | 1.7 km || 
|-id=529 bgcolor=#E9E9E9
| 393529 ||  || — || September 7, 2002 || Socorro || LINEAR || — || align=right | 2.5 km || 
|-id=530 bgcolor=#E9E9E9
| 393530 ||  || — || October 2, 2002 || Socorro || LINEAR || — || align=right | 2.5 km || 
|-id=531 bgcolor=#fefefe
| 393531 ||  || — || October 10, 2002 || Socorro || LINEAR || H || align=right | 1.0 km || 
|-id=532 bgcolor=#E9E9E9
| 393532 ||  || — || October 4, 2002 || Apache Point || SDSS || GEF || align=right | 2.4 km || 
|-id=533 bgcolor=#E9E9E9
| 393533 ||  || — || October 4, 2002 || Apache Point || SDSS || — || align=right | 2.1 km || 
|-id=534 bgcolor=#E9E9E9
| 393534 ||  || — || October 5, 2002 || Apache Point || SDSS || EUN || align=right | 2.3 km || 
|-id=535 bgcolor=#E9E9E9
| 393535 ||  || — || October 10, 2002 || Apache Point || SDSS || — || align=right | 1.9 km || 
|-id=536 bgcolor=#E9E9E9
| 393536 ||  || — || October 28, 2002 || Palomar || NEAT || — || align=right | 1.9 km || 
|-id=537 bgcolor=#E9E9E9
| 393537 ||  || — || October 28, 2002 || Palomar || NEAT || EUN || align=right | 2.3 km || 
|-id=538 bgcolor=#fefefe
| 393538 ||  || — || October 28, 2002 || Haleakala || NEAT || — || align=right data-sort-value="0.97" | 970 m || 
|-id=539 bgcolor=#E9E9E9
| 393539 ||  || — || October 31, 2002 || Palomar || NEAT || — || align=right | 2.4 km || 
|-id=540 bgcolor=#fefefe
| 393540 ||  || — || October 30, 2002 || Palomar || NEAT || — || align=right data-sort-value="0.82" | 820 m || 
|-id=541 bgcolor=#E9E9E9
| 393541 ||  || — || October 28, 2002 || Kitt Peak || Spacewatch ||  || align=right | 2.8 km || 
|-id=542 bgcolor=#E9E9E9
| 393542 ||  || — || November 5, 2002 || Anderson Mesa || LONEOS || — || align=right | 1.9 km || 
|-id=543 bgcolor=#fefefe
| 393543 ||  || — || November 11, 2002 || Socorro || LINEAR || — || align=right data-sort-value="0.72" | 720 m || 
|-id=544 bgcolor=#E9E9E9
| 393544 ||  || — || November 12, 2002 || Socorro || LINEAR || — || align=right | 1.6 km || 
|-id=545 bgcolor=#fefefe
| 393545 ||  || — || November 11, 2002 || Socorro || LINEAR || — || align=right data-sort-value="0.66" | 660 m || 
|-id=546 bgcolor=#E9E9E9
| 393546 ||  || — || November 13, 2002 || Palomar || NEAT || — || align=right | 3.5 km || 
|-id=547 bgcolor=#E9E9E9
| 393547 ||  || — || November 24, 2002 || Palomar || NEAT || — || align=right | 2.4 km || 
|-id=548 bgcolor=#E9E9E9
| 393548 ||  || — || December 11, 2002 || Socorro || LINEAR || GEF || align=right | 3.1 km || 
|-id=549 bgcolor=#E9E9E9
| 393549 ||  || — || December 3, 2002 || Palomar || NEAT || — || align=right | 2.2 km || 
|-id=550 bgcolor=#fefefe
| 393550 ||  || — || January 11, 2003 || Socorro || LINEAR || — || align=right data-sort-value="0.91" | 910 m || 
|-id=551 bgcolor=#d6d6d6
| 393551 ||  || — || January 25, 2003 || Palomar || NEAT || — || align=right | 3.6 km || 
|-id=552 bgcolor=#E9E9E9
| 393552 ||  || — || January 30, 2003 || Anderson Mesa || LONEOS || — || align=right | 2.0 km || 
|-id=553 bgcolor=#d6d6d6
| 393553 ||  || — || February 4, 2003 || Haleakala || NEAT || — || align=right | 2.5 km || 
|-id=554 bgcolor=#d6d6d6
| 393554 ||  || — || February 22, 2003 || Palomar || NEAT || — || align=right | 3.5 km || 
|-id=555 bgcolor=#d6d6d6
| 393555 ||  || — || March 24, 2003 || Kitt Peak || Spacewatch || — || align=right | 2.3 km || 
|-id=556 bgcolor=#fefefe
| 393556 ||  || — || March 23, 2003 || Kitt Peak || Spacewatch || — || align=right data-sort-value="0.62" | 620 m || 
|-id=557 bgcolor=#fefefe
| 393557 ||  || — || March 23, 2003 || Kitt Peak || Spacewatch || — || align=right data-sort-value="0.80" | 800 m || 
|-id=558 bgcolor=#d6d6d6
| 393558 ||  || — || April 8, 2003 || Kitt Peak || Spacewatch || — || align=right | 2.7 km || 
|-id=559 bgcolor=#d6d6d6
| 393559 ||  || — || April 3, 2003 || Cerro Tololo || DLS || — || align=right | 3.1 km || 
|-id=560 bgcolor=#d6d6d6
| 393560 ||  || — || April 8, 2003 || Palomar || NEAT || — || align=right | 3.0 km || 
|-id=561 bgcolor=#d6d6d6
| 393561 ||  || — || April 24, 2003 || Kitt Peak || Spacewatch || — || align=right | 3.0 km || 
|-id=562 bgcolor=#d6d6d6
| 393562 ||  || — || April 25, 2003 || Kitt Peak || Spacewatch || — || align=right | 3.7 km || 
|-id=563 bgcolor=#d6d6d6
| 393563 ||  || — || April 26, 2003 || Kitt Peak || Spacewatch || — || align=right | 3.7 km || 
|-id=564 bgcolor=#d6d6d6
| 393564 ||  || — || April 30, 2003 || Kitt Peak || Spacewatch || — || align=right | 2.7 km || 
|-id=565 bgcolor=#d6d6d6
| 393565 ||  || — || May 1, 2003 || Kitt Peak || Spacewatch || — || align=right | 2.8 km || 
|-id=566 bgcolor=#d6d6d6
| 393566 ||  || — || May 2, 2003 || Kitt Peak || Spacewatch || — || align=right | 3.9 km || 
|-id=567 bgcolor=#fefefe
| 393567 ||  || — || May 2, 2003 || Socorro || LINEAR || (5026) || align=right | 1.0 km || 
|-id=568 bgcolor=#fefefe
| 393568 ||  || — || May 4, 2003 || Kleť || J. Tichá, M. Tichý || H || align=right data-sort-value="0.80" | 800 m || 
|-id=569 bgcolor=#FFC2E0
| 393569 ||  || — || May 7, 2003 || Kitt Peak || Spacewatch || APOcritical || align=right data-sort-value="0.55" | 550 m || 
|-id=570 bgcolor=#d6d6d6
| 393570 ||  || — || May 6, 2003 || Kitt Peak || Spacewatch || HYG || align=right | 2.6 km || 
|-id=571 bgcolor=#d6d6d6
| 393571 ||  || — || May 1, 2003 || Kitt Peak || Spacewatch || — || align=right | 3.1 km || 
|-id=572 bgcolor=#d6d6d6
| 393572 ||  || — || May 23, 2003 || Kitt Peak || Spacewatch || — || align=right | 2.9 km || 
|-id=573 bgcolor=#d6d6d6
| 393573 ||  || — || May 26, 2003 || Kitt Peak || Spacewatch || — || align=right | 2.9 km || 
|-id=574 bgcolor=#d6d6d6
| 393574 ||  || — || May 26, 2003 || Kitt Peak || Spacewatch || — || align=right | 3.3 km || 
|-id=575 bgcolor=#fefefe
| 393575 ||  || — || August 22, 2003 || Socorro || LINEAR || — || align=right | 1.1 km || 
|-id=576 bgcolor=#fefefe
| 393576 ||  || — || September 15, 2003 || Palomar || NEAT || — || align=right | 1.3 km || 
|-id=577 bgcolor=#fefefe
| 393577 ||  || — || September 15, 2003 || Anderson Mesa || LONEOS || — || align=right data-sort-value="0.86" | 860 m || 
|-id=578 bgcolor=#E9E9E9
| 393578 ||  || — || September 18, 2003 || Kitt Peak || Spacewatch || RAF || align=right | 1.1 km || 
|-id=579 bgcolor=#E9E9E9
| 393579 ||  || — || September 17, 2003 || Socorro || LINEAR || — || align=right | 1.0 km || 
|-id=580 bgcolor=#E9E9E9
| 393580 ||  || — || September 22, 2003 || Anderson Mesa || LONEOS || — || align=right data-sort-value="0.73" | 730 m || 
|-id=581 bgcolor=#E9E9E9
| 393581 ||  || — || September 7, 2003 || Socorro || LINEAR || — || align=right | 1.1 km || 
|-id=582 bgcolor=#E9E9E9
| 393582 ||  || — || September 23, 2003 || Haleakala || NEAT || — || align=right data-sort-value="0.86" | 860 m || 
|-id=583 bgcolor=#E9E9E9
| 393583 ||  || — || September 28, 2003 || Desert Eagle || W. K. Y. Yeung || EUN || align=right | 1.0 km || 
|-id=584 bgcolor=#E9E9E9
| 393584 ||  || — || September 26, 2003 || Socorro || LINEAR || — || align=right | 2.0 km || 
|-id=585 bgcolor=#E9E9E9
| 393585 ||  || — || September 27, 2003 || Kitt Peak || Spacewatch || (5) || align=right | 1.5 km || 
|-id=586 bgcolor=#E9E9E9
| 393586 ||  || — || September 30, 2003 || Socorro || LINEAR || — || align=right | 1.8 km || 
|-id=587 bgcolor=#E9E9E9
| 393587 ||  || — || September 23, 2003 || Palomar || NEAT || BRG || align=right | 1.1 km || 
|-id=588 bgcolor=#E9E9E9
| 393588 ||  || — || September 28, 2003 || Socorro || LINEAR || — || align=right | 1.6 km || 
|-id=589 bgcolor=#E9E9E9
| 393589 ||  || — || September 26, 2003 || Apache Point || SDSS || — || align=right | 1.3 km || 
|-id=590 bgcolor=#E9E9E9
| 393590 ||  || — || September 26, 2003 || Apache Point || SDSS || — || align=right | 1.2 km || 
|-id=591 bgcolor=#E9E9E9
| 393591 ||  || — || September 27, 2003 || Apache Point || SDSS || — || align=right | 1.4 km || 
|-id=592 bgcolor=#E9E9E9
| 393592 ||  || — || October 3, 2003 || Kitt Peak || Spacewatch || — || align=right | 2.0 km || 
|-id=593 bgcolor=#E9E9E9
| 393593 ||  || — || October 21, 2003 || Socorro || LINEAR || — || align=right | 1.8 km || 
|-id=594 bgcolor=#E9E9E9
| 393594 ||  || — || October 1, 2003 || Anderson Mesa || LONEOS || (1547) || align=right | 1.9 km || 
|-id=595 bgcolor=#E9E9E9
| 393595 ||  || — || October 18, 2003 || Kitt Peak || Spacewatch || — || align=right | 1.1 km || 
|-id=596 bgcolor=#fefefe
| 393596 ||  || — || October 19, 2003 || Kitt Peak || Spacewatch || — || align=right data-sort-value="0.82" | 820 m || 
|-id=597 bgcolor=#E9E9E9
| 393597 ||  || — || October 21, 2003 || Kitt Peak || Spacewatch || — || align=right | 1.8 km || 
|-id=598 bgcolor=#E9E9E9
| 393598 ||  || — || October 20, 2003 || Kitt Peak || Spacewatch || — || align=right | 1.0 km || 
|-id=599 bgcolor=#fefefe
| 393599 ||  || — || October 22, 2003 || Socorro || LINEAR || — || align=right data-sort-value="0.72" | 720 m || 
|-id=600 bgcolor=#E9E9E9
| 393600 ||  || — || September 28, 2003 || Anderson Mesa || LONEOS || MAR || align=right | 2.4 km || 
|}

393601–393700 

|-bgcolor=#E9E9E9
| 393601 ||  || — || October 21, 2003 || Kitt Peak || Spacewatch || — || align=right | 1.5 km || 
|-id=602 bgcolor=#E9E9E9
| 393602 ||  || — || October 23, 2003 || Anderson Mesa || LONEOS || — || align=right | 1.8 km || 
|-id=603 bgcolor=#E9E9E9
| 393603 ||  || — || September 28, 2003 || Anderson Mesa || LONEOS || — || align=right | 1.9 km || 
|-id=604 bgcolor=#E9E9E9
| 393604 ||  || — || October 16, 2003 || Kitt Peak || Spacewatch || — || align=right | 1.4 km || 
|-id=605 bgcolor=#E9E9E9
| 393605 ||  || — || October 16, 2003 || Kitt Peak || Spacewatch || (5) || align=right data-sort-value="0.87" | 870 m || 
|-id=606 bgcolor=#E9E9E9
| 393606 ||  || — || October 19, 2003 || Kitt Peak || Spacewatch || — || align=right data-sort-value="0.86" | 860 m || 
|-id=607 bgcolor=#E9E9E9
| 393607 ||  || — || November 19, 2003 || Kitt Peak || Spacewatch || (5) || align=right | 1.3 km || 
|-id=608 bgcolor=#E9E9E9
| 393608 ||  || — || November 20, 2003 || Kitt Peak || Spacewatch || — || align=right | 2.7 km || 
|-id=609 bgcolor=#E9E9E9
| 393609 ||  || — || November 30, 2003 || Kitt Peak || Spacewatch || — || align=right | 1.3 km || 
|-id=610 bgcolor=#E9E9E9
| 393610 ||  || — || November 30, 2003 || Socorro || LINEAR || — || align=right | 2.2 km || 
|-id=611 bgcolor=#E9E9E9
| 393611 ||  || — || November 19, 2003 || Kitt Peak || Spacewatch || critical || align=right | 1.9 km || 
|-id=612 bgcolor=#E9E9E9
| 393612 ||  || — || December 19, 2003 || Kitt Peak || Spacewatch || EUN || align=right | 1.9 km || 
|-id=613 bgcolor=#E9E9E9
| 393613 ||  || — || November 24, 2003 || Kitt Peak || Spacewatch || — || align=right | 1.9 km || 
|-id=614 bgcolor=#E9E9E9
| 393614 ||  || — || December 18, 2003 || Socorro || LINEAR || GEF || align=right | 2.6 km || 
|-id=615 bgcolor=#E9E9E9
| 393615 ||  || — || January 19, 2004 || Kitt Peak || Spacewatch || — || align=right | 1.9 km || 
|-id=616 bgcolor=#E9E9E9
| 393616 ||  || — || January 16, 2004 || Kitt Peak || Spacewatch || MRX || align=right | 2.3 km || 
|-id=617 bgcolor=#fefefe
| 393617 ||  || — || January 19, 2004 || Kitt Peak || Spacewatch || — || align=right data-sort-value="0.51" | 510 m || 
|-id=618 bgcolor=#E9E9E9
| 393618 ||  || — || January 28, 2004 || Kitt Peak || Spacewatch || — || align=right | 2.0 km || 
|-id=619 bgcolor=#fefefe
| 393619 ||  || — || February 19, 2004 || Socorro || LINEAR || — || align=right | 1.1 km || 
|-id=620 bgcolor=#E9E9E9
| 393620 ||  || — || February 22, 2004 || Kitt Peak || Spacewatch || — || align=right | 2.2 km || 
|-id=621 bgcolor=#d6d6d6
| 393621 ||  || — || March 14, 2004 || Kitt Peak || Spacewatch || — || align=right | 2.1 km || 
|-id=622 bgcolor=#fefefe
| 393622 ||  || — || March 14, 2004 || Kitt Peak || Spacewatch || — || align=right data-sort-value="0.67" | 670 m || 
|-id=623 bgcolor=#fefefe
| 393623 ||  || — || March 16, 2004 || Kitt Peak || Spacewatch || — || align=right data-sort-value="0.97" | 970 m || 
|-id=624 bgcolor=#FA8072
| 393624 ||  || — || March 19, 2004 || Socorro || LINEAR || H || align=right data-sort-value="0.55" | 550 m || 
|-id=625 bgcolor=#fefefe
| 393625 ||  || — || March 27, 2004 || Socorro || LINEAR || H || align=right data-sort-value="0.68" | 680 m || 
|-id=626 bgcolor=#d6d6d6
| 393626 ||  || — || March 17, 2004 || Kitt Peak || Spacewatch || — || align=right | 2.3 km || 
|-id=627 bgcolor=#d6d6d6
| 393627 ||  || — || April 10, 2004 || Palomar || NEAT || — || align=right | 3.8 km || 
|-id=628 bgcolor=#d6d6d6
| 393628 ||  || — || April 12, 2004 || Kitt Peak || Spacewatch || — || align=right | 2.1 km || 
|-id=629 bgcolor=#fefefe
| 393629 ||  || — || April 13, 2004 || Kitt Peak || Spacewatch || — || align=right data-sort-value="0.75" | 750 m || 
|-id=630 bgcolor=#fefefe
| 393630 ||  || — || April 13, 2004 || Catalina || CSS || H || align=right data-sort-value="0.97" | 970 m || 
|-id=631 bgcolor=#d6d6d6
| 393631 ||  || — || April 21, 2004 || Kitt Peak || Spacewatch || — || align=right | 2.7 km || 
|-id=632 bgcolor=#fefefe
| 393632 ||  || — || May 15, 2004 || Socorro || LINEAR || — || align=right data-sort-value="0.77" | 770 m || 
|-id=633 bgcolor=#fefefe
| 393633 ||  || — || May 20, 2004 || Kitt Peak || Spacewatch || — || align=right data-sort-value="0.49" | 490 m || 
|-id=634 bgcolor=#fefefe
| 393634 ||  || — || June 11, 2004 || Kitt Peak || Spacewatch || — || align=right data-sort-value="0.81" | 810 m || 
|-id=635 bgcolor=#d6d6d6
| 393635 ||  || — || June 14, 2004 || Kitt Peak || Spacewatch || — || align=right | 3.1 km || 
|-id=636 bgcolor=#fefefe
| 393636 ||  || — || July 9, 2004 || Socorro || LINEAR || — || align=right | 1.1 km || 
|-id=637 bgcolor=#d6d6d6
| 393637 ||  || — || July 11, 2004 || Socorro || LINEAR || — || align=right | 2.3 km || 
|-id=638 bgcolor=#fefefe
| 393638 ||  || — || July 11, 2004 || Socorro || LINEAR || — || align=right data-sort-value="0.75" | 750 m || 
|-id=639 bgcolor=#d6d6d6
| 393639 ||  || — || July 14, 2004 || Socorro || LINEAR || TIR || align=right | 3.4 km || 
|-id=640 bgcolor=#fefefe
| 393640 ||  || — || August 7, 2004 || Palomar || NEAT || — || align=right | 1.3 km || 
|-id=641 bgcolor=#FA8072
| 393641 ||  || — || August 8, 2004 || Anderson Mesa || LONEOS || — || align=right data-sort-value="0.71" | 710 m || 
|-id=642 bgcolor=#d6d6d6
| 393642 ||  || — || August 8, 2004 || Socorro || LINEAR || — || align=right | 3.5 km || 
|-id=643 bgcolor=#fefefe
| 393643 ||  || — || July 17, 2004 || Socorro || LINEAR || H || align=right data-sort-value="0.77" | 770 m || 
|-id=644 bgcolor=#fefefe
| 393644 ||  || — || August 8, 2004 || Socorro || LINEAR || — || align=right data-sort-value="0.76" | 760 m || 
|-id=645 bgcolor=#fefefe
| 393645 ||  || — || August 8, 2004 || Socorro || LINEAR || — || align=right data-sort-value="0.75" | 750 m || 
|-id=646 bgcolor=#fefefe
| 393646 ||  || — || August 8, 2004 || Anderson Mesa || LONEOS || NYS || align=right data-sort-value="0.89" | 890 m || 
|-id=647 bgcolor=#d6d6d6
| 393647 ||  || — || August 9, 2004 || Socorro || LINEAR || — || align=right | 2.6 km || 
|-id=648 bgcolor=#fefefe
| 393648 ||  || — || August 10, 2004 || Socorro || LINEAR || — || align=right data-sort-value="0.86" | 860 m || 
|-id=649 bgcolor=#fefefe
| 393649 ||  || — || August 12, 2004 || Socorro || LINEAR || — || align=right data-sort-value="0.82" | 820 m || 
|-id=650 bgcolor=#d6d6d6
| 393650 ||  || — || August 15, 2004 || Palomar || NEAT || Tj (2.99) || align=right | 6.6 km || 
|-id=651 bgcolor=#fefefe
| 393651 ||  || — || August 9, 2004 || Socorro || LINEAR || H || align=right data-sort-value="0.85" | 850 m || 
|-id=652 bgcolor=#d6d6d6
| 393652 ||  || — || August 12, 2004 || Mauna Kea || P. A. Wiegert || URS || align=right | 3.7 km || 
|-id=653 bgcolor=#fefefe
| 393653 ||  || — || August 21, 2004 || Reedy Creek || J. Broughton || — || align=right | 1.1 km || 
|-id=654 bgcolor=#d6d6d6
| 393654 ||  || — || August 20, 2004 || Socorro || LINEAR || TIR || align=right | 3.3 km || 
|-id=655 bgcolor=#d6d6d6
| 393655 ||  || — || September 3, 2004 || Palomar || NEAT || — || align=right | 5.2 km || 
|-id=656 bgcolor=#d6d6d6
| 393656 ||  || — || September 4, 2004 || Palomar || NEAT || THB || align=right | 6.9 km || 
|-id=657 bgcolor=#FA8072
| 393657 ||  || — || September 6, 2004 || Socorro || LINEAR || PHO || align=right data-sort-value="0.75" | 750 m || 
|-id=658 bgcolor=#fefefe
| 393658 ||  || — || August 21, 2004 || Catalina || CSS || H || align=right data-sort-value="0.96" | 960 m || 
|-id=659 bgcolor=#fefefe
| 393659 ||  || — || September 7, 2004 || Socorro || LINEAR || — || align=right data-sort-value="0.76" | 760 m || 
|-id=660 bgcolor=#fefefe
| 393660 ||  || — || September 7, 2004 || Socorro || LINEAR || — || align=right | 1.3 km || 
|-id=661 bgcolor=#fefefe
| 393661 ||  || — || September 7, 2004 || Kitt Peak || Spacewatch || — || align=right data-sort-value="0.76" | 760 m || 
|-id=662 bgcolor=#d6d6d6
| 393662 ||  || — || September 7, 2004 || Socorro || LINEAR || — || align=right | 4.4 km || 
|-id=663 bgcolor=#fefefe
| 393663 ||  || — || September 7, 2004 || Kitt Peak || Spacewatch || MAS || align=right data-sort-value="0.76" | 760 m || 
|-id=664 bgcolor=#d6d6d6
| 393664 ||  || — || September 8, 2004 || Socorro || LINEAR || HYG || align=right | 3.1 km || 
|-id=665 bgcolor=#fefefe
| 393665 ||  || — || September 8, 2004 || Socorro || LINEAR || — || align=right data-sort-value="0.97" | 970 m || 
|-id=666 bgcolor=#fefefe
| 393666 ||  || — || August 11, 2004 || Socorro || LINEAR || — || align=right data-sort-value="0.94" | 940 m || 
|-id=667 bgcolor=#d6d6d6
| 393667 ||  || — || September 8, 2004 || Socorro || LINEAR || — || align=right | 3.5 km || 
|-id=668 bgcolor=#d6d6d6
| 393668 ||  || — || September 8, 2004 || Socorro || LINEAR || — || align=right | 2.5 km || 
|-id=669 bgcolor=#d6d6d6
| 393669 ||  || — || September 8, 2004 || Socorro || LINEAR || — || align=right | 3.4 km || 
|-id=670 bgcolor=#d6d6d6
| 393670 ||  || — || September 8, 2004 || Palomar || NEAT || — || align=right | 4.2 km || 
|-id=671 bgcolor=#FA8072
| 393671 ||  || — || August 20, 2004 || Catalina || CSS || H || align=right data-sort-value="0.69" | 690 m || 
|-id=672 bgcolor=#fefefe
| 393672 ||  || — || September 7, 2004 || Socorro || LINEAR || — || align=right data-sort-value="0.88" | 880 m || 
|-id=673 bgcolor=#fefefe
| 393673 ||  || — || September 10, 2004 || Socorro || LINEAR || V || align=right data-sort-value="0.86" | 860 m || 
|-id=674 bgcolor=#d6d6d6
| 393674 ||  || — || September 9, 2004 || Socorro || LINEAR || Tj (2.97) || align=right | 4.1 km || 
|-id=675 bgcolor=#d6d6d6
| 393675 ||  || — || September 10, 2004 || Socorro || LINEAR || TIR || align=right | 3.5 km || 
|-id=676 bgcolor=#fefefe
| 393676 ||  || — || September 10, 2004 || Socorro || LINEAR || H || align=right data-sort-value="0.81" | 810 m || 
|-id=677 bgcolor=#d6d6d6
| 393677 ||  || — || September 11, 2004 || Socorro || LINEAR || — || align=right | 5.1 km || 
|-id=678 bgcolor=#fefefe
| 393678 ||  || — || September 9, 2004 || Kitt Peak || Spacewatch || MAS || align=right data-sort-value="0.72" | 720 m || 
|-id=679 bgcolor=#d6d6d6
| 393679 ||  || — || September 12, 2004 || Socorro || LINEAR || — || align=right | 4.1 km || 
|-id=680 bgcolor=#d6d6d6
| 393680 ||  || — || July 14, 2004 || Socorro || LINEAR || — || align=right | 3.7 km || 
|-id=681 bgcolor=#fefefe
| 393681 ||  || — || August 15, 2004 || Siding Spring || SSS || MAS || align=right data-sort-value="0.86" | 860 m || 
|-id=682 bgcolor=#fefefe
| 393682 ||  || — || September 13, 2004 || Kitt Peak || Spacewatch || V || align=right data-sort-value="0.78" | 780 m || 
|-id=683 bgcolor=#fefefe
| 393683 ||  || — || September 11, 2004 || Kitt Peak || Spacewatch || V || align=right data-sort-value="0.74" | 740 m || 
|-id=684 bgcolor=#d6d6d6
| 393684 ||  || — || September 15, 2004 || Anderson Mesa || LONEOS || — || align=right | 2.9 km || 
|-id=685 bgcolor=#d6d6d6
| 393685 ||  || — || September 15, 2004 || Siding Spring || SSS || THB || align=right | 3.4 km || 
|-id=686 bgcolor=#fefefe
| 393686 ||  || — || September 17, 2004 || Socorro || LINEAR || — || align=right data-sort-value="0.94" | 940 m || 
|-id=687 bgcolor=#fefefe
| 393687 ||  || — || September 18, 2004 || Socorro || LINEAR || H || align=right data-sort-value="0.64" | 640 m || 
|-id=688 bgcolor=#fefefe
| 393688 ||  || — || September 17, 2004 || Kitt Peak || Spacewatch || V || align=right | 1.1 km || 
|-id=689 bgcolor=#fefefe
| 393689 ||  || — || September 17, 2004 || Socorro || LINEAR || — || align=right data-sort-value="0.71" | 710 m || 
|-id=690 bgcolor=#d6d6d6
| 393690 ||  || — || September 17, 2004 || Socorro || LINEAR || — || align=right | 4.2 km || 
|-id=691 bgcolor=#fefefe
| 393691 ||  || — || September 15, 2004 || Kitt Peak || Spacewatch || NYS || align=right data-sort-value="0.77" | 770 m || 
|-id=692 bgcolor=#fefefe
| 393692 ||  || — || September 22, 2004 || Kitt Peak || Spacewatch || H || align=right data-sort-value="0.75" | 750 m || 
|-id=693 bgcolor=#fefefe
| 393693 ||  || — || October 4, 2004 || Kitt Peak || Spacewatch || — || align=right data-sort-value="0.90" | 900 m || 
|-id=694 bgcolor=#fefefe
| 393694 ||  || — || October 4, 2004 || Kitt Peak || Spacewatch || — || align=right data-sort-value="0.82" | 820 m || 
|-id=695 bgcolor=#fefefe
| 393695 ||  || — || August 26, 2004 || Catalina || CSS || — || align=right data-sort-value="0.92" | 920 m || 
|-id=696 bgcolor=#fefefe
| 393696 ||  || — || September 24, 2004 || Kitt Peak || Spacewatch || — || align=right data-sort-value="0.54" | 540 m || 
|-id=697 bgcolor=#fefefe
| 393697 ||  || — || September 17, 2004 || Kitt Peak || Spacewatch || — || align=right data-sort-value="0.71" | 710 m || 
|-id=698 bgcolor=#fefefe
| 393698 ||  || — || September 21, 2004 || Socorro || LINEAR || H || align=right data-sort-value="0.81" | 810 m || 
|-id=699 bgcolor=#d6d6d6
| 393699 ||  || — || September 17, 2004 || Kitt Peak || Spacewatch || — || align=right | 3.2 km || 
|-id=700 bgcolor=#fefefe
| 393700 ||  || — || October 6, 2004 || Kitt Peak || Spacewatch || — || align=right data-sort-value="0.87" | 870 m || 
|}

393701–393800 

|-bgcolor=#fefefe
| 393701 ||  || — || October 4, 2004 || Kitt Peak || Spacewatch || — || align=right | 1.1 km || 
|-id=702 bgcolor=#d6d6d6
| 393702 ||  || — || October 6, 2004 || Palomar || NEAT || — || align=right | 4.1 km || 
|-id=703 bgcolor=#fefefe
| 393703 ||  || — || October 6, 2004 || Kitt Peak || Spacewatch || — || align=right data-sort-value="0.65" | 650 m || 
|-id=704 bgcolor=#fefefe
| 393704 ||  || — || September 23, 2004 || Kitt Peak || Spacewatch || — || align=right data-sort-value="0.75" | 750 m || 
|-id=705 bgcolor=#fefefe
| 393705 ||  || — || October 6, 2004 || Kitt Peak || Spacewatch || — || align=right data-sort-value="0.97" | 970 m || 
|-id=706 bgcolor=#fefefe
| 393706 ||  || — || October 6, 2004 || Kitt Peak || Spacewatch || NYS || align=right data-sort-value="0.78" | 780 m || 
|-id=707 bgcolor=#d6d6d6
| 393707 ||  || — || October 8, 2004 || Socorro || LINEAR || EUP || align=right | 6.0 km || 
|-id=708 bgcolor=#fefefe
| 393708 ||  || — || October 6, 2004 || Kitt Peak || Spacewatch || MAS || align=right data-sort-value="0.78" | 780 m || 
|-id=709 bgcolor=#d6d6d6
| 393709 ||  || — || October 7, 2004 || Kitt Peak || Spacewatch || THM || align=right | 2.6 km || 
|-id=710 bgcolor=#d6d6d6
| 393710 ||  || — || October 5, 2004 || Kitt Peak || Spacewatch || EUP || align=right | 3.1 km || 
|-id=711 bgcolor=#fefefe
| 393711 ||  || — || October 7, 2004 || Socorro || LINEAR || — || align=right | 1.2 km || 
|-id=712 bgcolor=#fefefe
| 393712 ||  || — || October 9, 2004 || Kitt Peak || Spacewatch || — || align=right data-sort-value="0.98" | 980 m || 
|-id=713 bgcolor=#fefefe
| 393713 ||  || — || October 9, 2004 || Kitt Peak || Spacewatch || V || align=right | 1.1 km || 
|-id=714 bgcolor=#fefefe
| 393714 ||  || — || September 7, 2004 || Kitt Peak || Spacewatch || NYS || align=right data-sort-value="0.80" | 800 m || 
|-id=715 bgcolor=#fefefe
| 393715 ||  || — || October 9, 2004 || Socorro || LINEAR || — || align=right | 1.1 km || 
|-id=716 bgcolor=#d6d6d6
| 393716 ||  || — || October 12, 2004 || Kitt Peak || Spacewatch || TIR || align=right | 3.0 km || 
|-id=717 bgcolor=#fefefe
| 393717 ||  || — || October 23, 2004 || Socorro || LINEAR || H || align=right data-sort-value="0.95" | 950 m || 
|-id=718 bgcolor=#fefefe
| 393718 ||  || — || November 4, 2004 || Kitt Peak || Spacewatch || NYS || align=right data-sort-value="0.84" | 840 m || 
|-id=719 bgcolor=#fefefe
| 393719 ||  || — || November 7, 2004 || Socorro || LINEAR || H || align=right data-sort-value="0.90" | 900 m || 
|-id=720 bgcolor=#fefefe
| 393720 ||  || — || October 15, 2004 || Kitt Peak || Spacewatch || — || align=right | 1.0 km || 
|-id=721 bgcolor=#fefefe
| 393721 ||  || — || November 3, 2004 || Kitt Peak || Spacewatch || — || align=right | 1.1 km || 
|-id=722 bgcolor=#fefefe
| 393722 ||  || — || October 15, 2004 || Mount Lemmon || Mount Lemmon Survey || MAS || align=right data-sort-value="0.82" | 820 m || 
|-id=723 bgcolor=#E9E9E9
| 393723 ||  || — || December 2, 2004 || Palomar || NEAT || — || align=right | 1.1 km || 
|-id=724 bgcolor=#E9E9E9
| 393724 ||  || — || December 8, 2004 || Socorro || LINEAR || — || align=right | 1.4 km || 
|-id=725 bgcolor=#E9E9E9
| 393725 ||  || — || December 9, 2004 || Kitt Peak || Spacewatch || — || align=right | 1.3 km || 
|-id=726 bgcolor=#E9E9E9
| 393726 ||  || — || December 10, 2004 || Kitt Peak || Spacewatch || — || align=right | 1.1 km || 
|-id=727 bgcolor=#E9E9E9
| 393727 ||  || — || December 15, 2004 || Socorro || LINEAR || — || align=right | 1.3 km || 
|-id=728 bgcolor=#E9E9E9
| 393728 ||  || — || December 14, 2004 || Kitt Peak || Spacewatch || — || align=right | 1.4 km || 
|-id=729 bgcolor=#E9E9E9
| 393729 ||  || — || December 9, 2004 || Kitt Peak || Spacewatch || — || align=right data-sort-value="0.79" | 790 m || 
|-id=730 bgcolor=#E9E9E9
| 393730 ||  || — || December 16, 2004 || Kitt Peak || Spacewatch || — || align=right | 1.1 km || 
|-id=731 bgcolor=#E9E9E9
| 393731 ||  || — || December 18, 2004 || Mount Lemmon || Mount Lemmon Survey || — || align=right | 1.0 km || 
|-id=732 bgcolor=#E9E9E9
| 393732 ||  || — || January 15, 2005 || Anderson Mesa || LONEOS || — || align=right | 2.0 km || 
|-id=733 bgcolor=#E9E9E9
| 393733 ||  || — || January 15, 2005 || Kitt Peak || Spacewatch || — || align=right data-sort-value="0.88" | 880 m || 
|-id=734 bgcolor=#E9E9E9
| 393734 ||  || — || January 16, 2005 || Socorro || LINEAR || — || align=right | 2.6 km || 
|-id=735 bgcolor=#E9E9E9
| 393735 ||  || — || January 16, 2005 || Socorro || LINEAR || — || align=right | 1.9 km || 
|-id=736 bgcolor=#E9E9E9
| 393736 ||  || — || January 16, 2005 || Socorro || LINEAR || (5) || align=right | 1.1 km || 
|-id=737 bgcolor=#E9E9E9
| 393737 ||  || — || January 16, 2005 || Socorro || LINEAR || — || align=right | 2.2 km || 
|-id=738 bgcolor=#E9E9E9
| 393738 ||  || — || December 20, 2004 || Mount Lemmon || Mount Lemmon Survey || — || align=right | 2.0 km || 
|-id=739 bgcolor=#E9E9E9
| 393739 ||  || — || February 1, 2005 || Catalina || CSS || — || align=right | 1.3 km || 
|-id=740 bgcolor=#d6d6d6
| 393740 ||  || — || February 1, 2005 || Kitt Peak || Spacewatch || SHU3:2 || align=right | 7.4 km || 
|-id=741 bgcolor=#E9E9E9
| 393741 ||  || — || January 9, 2005 || Campo Imperatore || CINEOS || — || align=right | 1.5 km || 
|-id=742 bgcolor=#E9E9E9
| 393742 ||  || — || February 4, 2005 || Mount Lemmon || Mount Lemmon Survey || (5) || align=right | 1.0 km || 
|-id=743 bgcolor=#E9E9E9
| 393743 ||  || — || February 9, 2005 || Kitt Peak || Spacewatch || — || align=right | 1.4 km || 
|-id=744 bgcolor=#E9E9E9
| 393744 ||  || — || February 1, 2005 || Kitt Peak || Spacewatch || — || align=right | 1.3 km || 
|-id=745 bgcolor=#E9E9E9
| 393745 ||  || — || March 2, 2005 || Catalina || CSS || — || align=right | 1.4 km || 
|-id=746 bgcolor=#E9E9E9
| 393746 ||  || — || March 9, 2005 || Catalina || CSS || MAR || align=right | 2.3 km || 
|-id=747 bgcolor=#E9E9E9
| 393747 ||  || — || March 9, 2005 || Mount Lemmon || Mount Lemmon Survey || — || align=right | 1.7 km || 
|-id=748 bgcolor=#E9E9E9
| 393748 ||  || — || March 10, 2005 || Catalina || CSS || — || align=right | 1.6 km || 
|-id=749 bgcolor=#E9E9E9
| 393749 ||  || — || March 11, 2005 || Mount Lemmon || Mount Lemmon Survey || fast? || align=right | 1.2 km || 
|-id=750 bgcolor=#E9E9E9
| 393750 ||  || — || March 10, 2005 || Mount Lemmon || Mount Lemmon Survey || — || align=right | 1.5 km || 
|-id=751 bgcolor=#E9E9E9
| 393751 ||  || — || March 8, 2005 || Anderson Mesa || LONEOS || — || align=right | 1.6 km || 
|-id=752 bgcolor=#E9E9E9
| 393752 ||  || — || March 4, 2005 || Kitt Peak || Spacewatch || MIS || align=right | 1.5 km || 
|-id=753 bgcolor=#E9E9E9
| 393753 ||  || — || March 13, 2005 || Catalina || CSS || — || align=right | 1.7 km || 
|-id=754 bgcolor=#E9E9E9
| 393754 ||  || — || March 15, 2005 || New Milford || John J. McCarthy Obs. || ADE || align=right | 1.6 km || 
|-id=755 bgcolor=#E9E9E9
| 393755 ||  || — || March 10, 2005 || Mount Lemmon || Mount Lemmon Survey || — || align=right | 2.5 km || 
|-id=756 bgcolor=#E9E9E9
| 393756 ||  || — || March 11, 2005 || Mount Lemmon || Mount Lemmon Survey || — || align=right | 2.3 km || 
|-id=757 bgcolor=#E9E9E9
| 393757 ||  || — || March 11, 2005 || Mount Lemmon || Mount Lemmon Survey || — || align=right | 1.4 km || 
|-id=758 bgcolor=#E9E9E9
| 393758 ||  || — || March 13, 2005 || Kitt Peak || Spacewatch || — || align=right | 1.9 km || 
|-id=759 bgcolor=#E9E9E9
| 393759 ||  || — || March 30, 2005 || Catalina || CSS || — || align=right | 2.0 km || 
|-id=760 bgcolor=#E9E9E9
| 393760 ||  || — || March 17, 2005 || Mount Lemmon || Mount Lemmon Survey || — || align=right | 1.6 km || 
|-id=761 bgcolor=#E9E9E9
| 393761 ||  || — || April 2, 2005 || Mount Lemmon || Mount Lemmon Survey || — || align=right | 1.8 km || 
|-id=762 bgcolor=#E9E9E9
| 393762 ||  || — || April 4, 2005 || Kitt Peak || Spacewatch || — || align=right | 1.3 km || 
|-id=763 bgcolor=#E9E9E9
| 393763 ||  || — || April 5, 2005 || Mount Lemmon || Mount Lemmon Survey || AGN || align=right | 1.9 km || 
|-id=764 bgcolor=#E9E9E9
| 393764 ||  || — || April 4, 2005 || Mount Lemmon || Mount Lemmon Survey || MRX || align=right | 2.1 km || 
|-id=765 bgcolor=#E9E9E9
| 393765 ||  || — || April 7, 2005 || Palomar || NEAT || EUN || align=right | 2.2 km || 
|-id=766 bgcolor=#E9E9E9
| 393766 ||  || — || April 9, 2005 || Socorro || LINEAR || — || align=right | 1.7 km || 
|-id=767 bgcolor=#E9E9E9
| 393767 ||  || — || April 11, 2005 || Kitt Peak || Spacewatch || — || align=right | 1.6 km || 
|-id=768 bgcolor=#E9E9E9
| 393768 ||  || — || April 10, 2005 || Mount Lemmon || Mount Lemmon Survey || — || align=right | 2.6 km || 
|-id=769 bgcolor=#E9E9E9
| 393769 ||  || — || April 2, 2005 || Kitt Peak || Spacewatch || — || align=right | 2.3 km || 
|-id=770 bgcolor=#E9E9E9
| 393770 ||  || — || April 11, 2005 || Kitt Peak || Spacewatch || MIS || align=right | 1.9 km || 
|-id=771 bgcolor=#E9E9E9
| 393771 ||  || — || April 2, 2005 || Kitt Peak || Spacewatch || — || align=right | 3.0 km || 
|-id=772 bgcolor=#E9E9E9
| 393772 ||  || — || April 11, 2005 || Kitt Peak || Spacewatch || — || align=right | 2.2 km || 
|-id=773 bgcolor=#E9E9E9
| 393773 ||  || — || April 12, 2005 || Socorro || LINEAR || — || align=right | 2.1 km || 
|-id=774 bgcolor=#E9E9E9
| 393774 ||  || — || March 14, 2005 || Mount Lemmon || Mount Lemmon Survey || — || align=right | 2.1 km || 
|-id=775 bgcolor=#E9E9E9
| 393775 ||  || — || April 7, 2005 || Kitt Peak || Spacewatch || — || align=right | 2.8 km || 
|-id=776 bgcolor=#d6d6d6
| 393776 ||  || — || March 16, 2005 || Mount Lemmon || Mount Lemmon Survey || KOR || align=right | 2.8 km || 
|-id=777 bgcolor=#E9E9E9
| 393777 ||  || — || April 9, 2005 || Kitt Peak || Spacewatch || — || align=right | 1.4 km || 
|-id=778 bgcolor=#E9E9E9
| 393778 ||  || — || May 4, 2005 || Catalina || CSS || JUN || align=right | 2.3 km || 
|-id=779 bgcolor=#E9E9E9
| 393779 ||  || — || May 3, 2005 || Kitt Peak || Spacewatch || GEF || align=right | 2.0 km || 
|-id=780 bgcolor=#E9E9E9
| 393780 ||  || — || May 3, 2005 || Kitt Peak || Spacewatch || — || align=right | 3.1 km || 
|-id=781 bgcolor=#E9E9E9
| 393781 ||  || — || May 3, 2005 || Kitt Peak || Spacewatch || — || align=right | 2.2 km || 
|-id=782 bgcolor=#E9E9E9
| 393782 ||  || — || May 4, 2005 || Kitt Peak || Spacewatch || — || align=right | 1.8 km || 
|-id=783 bgcolor=#E9E9E9
| 393783 ||  || — || May 8, 2005 || Mount Lemmon || Mount Lemmon Survey || — || align=right | 2.1 km || 
|-id=784 bgcolor=#E9E9E9
| 393784 ||  || — || May 14, 2005 || Kitt Peak || Spacewatch || — || align=right | 2.4 km || 
|-id=785 bgcolor=#E9E9E9
| 393785 ||  || — || May 14, 2005 || Mount Lemmon || Mount Lemmon Survey || — || align=right | 2.1 km || 
|-id=786 bgcolor=#E9E9E9
| 393786 ||  || — || May 3, 2005 || Kitt Peak || Spacewatch || — || align=right | 2.9 km || 
|-id=787 bgcolor=#E9E9E9
| 393787 ||  || — || May 4, 2005 || Kitt Peak || Spacewatch || — || align=right | 2.1 km || 
|-id=788 bgcolor=#E9E9E9
| 393788 ||  || — || May 15, 2005 || Mount Lemmon || Mount Lemmon Survey || GEF || align=right | 2.2 km || 
|-id=789 bgcolor=#E9E9E9
| 393789 ||  || — || May 8, 2005 || Kitt Peak || Spacewatch || HOF || align=right | 2.6 km || 
|-id=790 bgcolor=#E9E9E9
| 393790 ||  || — || June 8, 2005 || Kitt Peak || Spacewatch || — || align=right | 2.4 km || 
|-id=791 bgcolor=#d6d6d6
| 393791 ||  || — || June 13, 2005 || Kitt Peak || Spacewatch || EOS || align=right | 2.8 km || 
|-id=792 bgcolor=#E9E9E9
| 393792 ||  || — || June 16, 2005 || Kitt Peak || Spacewatch || MRX || align=right | 2.1 km || 
|-id=793 bgcolor=#d6d6d6
| 393793 ||  || — || June 27, 2005 || Kitt Peak || Spacewatch || — || align=right | 2.9 km || 
|-id=794 bgcolor=#d6d6d6
| 393794 ||  || — || July 1, 2005 || Kitt Peak || Spacewatch || — || align=right | 3.0 km || 
|-id=795 bgcolor=#d6d6d6
| 393795 ||  || — || July 3, 2005 || Mount Lemmon || Mount Lemmon Survey || — || align=right | 2.0 km || 
|-id=796 bgcolor=#d6d6d6
| 393796 ||  || — || July 5, 2005 || Kitt Peak || Spacewatch || — || align=right | 2.0 km || 
|-id=797 bgcolor=#d6d6d6
| 393797 ||  || — || July 5, 2005 || Kitt Peak || Spacewatch || — || align=right | 2.4 km || 
|-id=798 bgcolor=#fefefe
| 393798 ||  || — || June 18, 2005 || Mount Lemmon || Mount Lemmon Survey || — || align=right data-sort-value="0.69" | 690 m || 
|-id=799 bgcolor=#d6d6d6
| 393799 ||  || — || August 10, 2005 || Cerro Tololo || M. W. Buie || EOS || align=right | 2.9 km || 
|-id=800 bgcolor=#fefefe
| 393800 ||  || — || August 26, 2005 || Anderson Mesa || LONEOS || — || align=right data-sort-value="0.80" | 800 m || 
|}

393801–393900 

|-bgcolor=#d6d6d6
| 393801 ||  || — || August 27, 2005 || Kitt Peak || Spacewatch || — || align=right | 2.6 km || 
|-id=802 bgcolor=#fefefe
| 393802 ||  || — || August 25, 2005 || Palomar || NEAT || — || align=right data-sort-value="0.79" | 790 m || 
|-id=803 bgcolor=#fefefe
| 393803 ||  || — || August 28, 2005 || Kitt Peak || Spacewatch || — || align=right data-sort-value="0.78" | 780 m || 
|-id=804 bgcolor=#FA8072
| 393804 ||  || — || August 3, 2005 || Socorro || LINEAR || — || align=right data-sort-value="0.90" | 900 m || 
|-id=805 bgcolor=#d6d6d6
| 393805 ||  || — || August 25, 2005 || Palomar || NEAT || THM || align=right | 2.9 km || 
|-id=806 bgcolor=#fefefe
| 393806 ||  || — || August 27, 2005 || Palomar || NEAT || — || align=right data-sort-value="0.68" | 680 m || 
|-id=807 bgcolor=#fefefe
| 393807 ||  || — || August 27, 2005 || Palomar || NEAT || — || align=right data-sort-value="0.61" | 610 m || 
|-id=808 bgcolor=#d6d6d6
| 393808 ||  || — || August 27, 2005 || Palomar || NEAT || — || align=right | 3.6 km || 
|-id=809 bgcolor=#d6d6d6
| 393809 ||  || — || August 28, 2005 || Kitt Peak || Spacewatch || — || align=right | 3.0 km || 
|-id=810 bgcolor=#d6d6d6
| 393810 ||  || — || August 30, 2005 || Kitt Peak || Spacewatch || EOS || align=right | 2.5 km || 
|-id=811 bgcolor=#d6d6d6
| 393811 ||  || — || August 28, 2005 || Siding Spring || SSS || — || align=right | 2.8 km || 
|-id=812 bgcolor=#d6d6d6
| 393812 ||  || — || August 31, 2005 || Kitt Peak || Spacewatch || — || align=right | 3.2 km || 
|-id=813 bgcolor=#d6d6d6
| 393813 ||  || — || August 30, 2005 || Kitt Peak || Spacewatch || — || align=right | 2.7 km || 
|-id=814 bgcolor=#fefefe
| 393814 ||  || — || September 1, 2005 || Kitt Peak || Spacewatch || — || align=right data-sort-value="0.79" | 790 m || 
|-id=815 bgcolor=#fefefe
| 393815 ||  || — || September 23, 2005 || Kitt Peak || Spacewatch || — || align=right data-sort-value="0.68" | 680 m || 
|-id=816 bgcolor=#d6d6d6
| 393816 ||  || — || September 23, 2005 || Kitt Peak || Spacewatch || — || align=right | 2.8 km || 
|-id=817 bgcolor=#fefefe
| 393817 ||  || — || September 26, 2005 || Kitt Peak || Spacewatch || — || align=right data-sort-value="0.72" | 720 m || 
|-id=818 bgcolor=#d6d6d6
| 393818 ||  || — || September 26, 2005 || Kitt Peak || Spacewatch || — || align=right | 3.0 km || 
|-id=819 bgcolor=#fefefe
| 393819 ||  || — || September 26, 2005 || Kitt Peak || Spacewatch || — || align=right data-sort-value="0.75" | 750 m || 
|-id=820 bgcolor=#d6d6d6
| 393820 ||  || — || September 23, 2005 || Kitt Peak || Spacewatch || EOS || align=right | 3.1 km || 
|-id=821 bgcolor=#fefefe
| 393821 ||  || — || September 23, 2005 || Kitt Peak || Spacewatch || — || align=right data-sort-value="0.73" | 730 m || 
|-id=822 bgcolor=#FA8072
| 393822 ||  || — || September 23, 2005 || Catalina || CSS || — || align=right data-sort-value="0.58" | 580 m || 
|-id=823 bgcolor=#d6d6d6
| 393823 ||  || — || September 24, 2005 || Kitt Peak || Spacewatch || — || align=right | 3.1 km || 
|-id=824 bgcolor=#d6d6d6
| 393824 ||  || — || September 26, 2005 || Kitt Peak || Spacewatch || — || align=right | 3.0 km || 
|-id=825 bgcolor=#d6d6d6
| 393825 ||  || — || September 1, 2005 || Kitt Peak || Spacewatch || — || align=right | 2.8 km || 
|-id=826 bgcolor=#fefefe
| 393826 ||  || — || September 27, 2005 || Kitt Peak || Spacewatch || — || align=right data-sort-value="0.68" | 680 m || 
|-id=827 bgcolor=#d6d6d6
| 393827 ||  || — || August 31, 2005 || Kitt Peak || Spacewatch || VER || align=right | 2.8 km || 
|-id=828 bgcolor=#d6d6d6
| 393828 ||  || — || September 24, 2005 || Kitt Peak || Spacewatch || — || align=right | 2.8 km || 
|-id=829 bgcolor=#d6d6d6
| 393829 ||  || — || September 24, 2005 || Kitt Peak || Spacewatch || — || align=right | 2.2 km || 
|-id=830 bgcolor=#d6d6d6
| 393830 ||  || — || September 24, 2005 || Kitt Peak || Spacewatch || VER || align=right | 2.9 km || 
|-id=831 bgcolor=#d6d6d6
| 393831 ||  || — || September 24, 2005 || Kitt Peak || Spacewatch || — || align=right | 2.5 km || 
|-id=832 bgcolor=#d6d6d6
| 393832 ||  || — || September 24, 2005 || Kitt Peak || Spacewatch || — || align=right | 3.5 km || 
|-id=833 bgcolor=#d6d6d6
| 393833 ||  || — || September 24, 2005 || Kitt Peak || Spacewatch || — || align=right | 3.1 km || 
|-id=834 bgcolor=#d6d6d6
| 393834 ||  || — || September 24, 2005 || Kitt Peak || Spacewatch || — || align=right | 2.2 km || 
|-id=835 bgcolor=#fefefe
| 393835 ||  || — || September 25, 2005 || Kitt Peak || Spacewatch || — || align=right data-sort-value="0.83" | 830 m || 
|-id=836 bgcolor=#d6d6d6
| 393836 ||  || — || September 26, 2005 || Kitt Peak || Spacewatch || EOS || align=right | 3.1 km || 
|-id=837 bgcolor=#fefefe
| 393837 ||  || — || September 26, 2005 || Kitt Peak || Spacewatch || — || align=right data-sort-value="0.74" | 740 m || 
|-id=838 bgcolor=#d6d6d6
| 393838 ||  || — || April 4, 2003 || Kitt Peak || Spacewatch || — || align=right | 3.3 km || 
|-id=839 bgcolor=#fefefe
| 393839 ||  || — || September 27, 2005 || Kitt Peak || Spacewatch || — || align=right data-sort-value="0.89" | 890 m || 
|-id=840 bgcolor=#fefefe
| 393840 ||  || — || September 29, 2005 || Kitt Peak || Spacewatch || — || align=right | 2.3 km || 
|-id=841 bgcolor=#fefefe
| 393841 ||  || — || September 29, 2005 || Kitt Peak || Spacewatch || — || align=right data-sort-value="0.77" | 770 m || 
|-id=842 bgcolor=#fefefe
| 393842 ||  || — || September 29, 2005 || Anderson Mesa || LONEOS || — || align=right data-sort-value="0.74" | 740 m || 
|-id=843 bgcolor=#d6d6d6
| 393843 ||  || — || September 29, 2005 || Kitt Peak || Spacewatch || — || align=right | 3.2 km || 
|-id=844 bgcolor=#d6d6d6
| 393844 ||  || — || September 25, 2005 || Kitt Peak || Spacewatch || — || align=right | 2.9 km || 
|-id=845 bgcolor=#d6d6d6
| 393845 ||  || — || September 25, 2005 || Kitt Peak || Spacewatch || — || align=right | 3.1 km || 
|-id=846 bgcolor=#d6d6d6
| 393846 ||  || — || September 25, 2005 || Kitt Peak || Spacewatch || EMA || align=right | 4.0 km || 
|-id=847 bgcolor=#d6d6d6
| 393847 ||  || — || September 25, 2005 || Kitt Peak || Spacewatch || — || align=right | 2.0 km || 
|-id=848 bgcolor=#fefefe
| 393848 ||  || — || September 26, 2005 || Kitt Peak || Spacewatch || — || align=right data-sort-value="0.71" | 710 m || 
|-id=849 bgcolor=#d6d6d6
| 393849 ||  || — || September 26, 2005 || Kitt Peak || Spacewatch || — || align=right | 2.8 km || 
|-id=850 bgcolor=#d6d6d6
| 393850 ||  || — || September 27, 2005 || Kitt Peak || Spacewatch || — || align=right | 2.3 km || 
|-id=851 bgcolor=#d6d6d6
| 393851 ||  || — || September 29, 2005 || Kitt Peak || Spacewatch || — || align=right | 3.1 km || 
|-id=852 bgcolor=#d6d6d6
| 393852 ||  || — || September 29, 2005 || Kitt Peak || Spacewatch || — || align=right | 3.2 km || 
|-id=853 bgcolor=#d6d6d6
| 393853 ||  || — || September 29, 2005 || Kitt Peak || Spacewatch || — || align=right | 3.2 km || 
|-id=854 bgcolor=#fefefe
| 393854 ||  || — || September 29, 2005 || Kitt Peak || Spacewatch || — || align=right data-sort-value="0.72" | 720 m || 
|-id=855 bgcolor=#d6d6d6
| 393855 ||  || — || September 29, 2005 || Mount Lemmon || Mount Lemmon Survey || — || align=right | 2.7 km || 
|-id=856 bgcolor=#d6d6d6
| 393856 ||  || — || August 31, 2005 || Kitt Peak || Spacewatch || — || align=right | 3.0 km || 
|-id=857 bgcolor=#d6d6d6
| 393857 ||  || — || September 1, 2005 || Campo Imperatore || CINEOS || EOS || align=right | 3.6 km || 
|-id=858 bgcolor=#FA8072
| 393858 ||  || — || September 29, 2005 || Catalina || CSS || — || align=right | 1.0 km || 
|-id=859 bgcolor=#FA8072
| 393859 ||  || — || September 29, 2005 || Catalina || CSS || — || align=right | 1.3 km || 
|-id=860 bgcolor=#d6d6d6
| 393860 ||  || — || September 30, 2005 || Kitt Peak || Spacewatch || — || align=right | 2.9 km || 
|-id=861 bgcolor=#d6d6d6
| 393861 ||  || — || September 30, 2005 || Mount Lemmon || Mount Lemmon Survey || — || align=right | 4.6 km || 
|-id=862 bgcolor=#d6d6d6
| 393862 ||  || — || September 30, 2005 || Mount Lemmon || Mount Lemmon Survey || — || align=right | 2.3 km || 
|-id=863 bgcolor=#d6d6d6
| 393863 ||  || — || September 30, 2005 || Kitt Peak || Spacewatch || EOS || align=right | 3.3 km || 
|-id=864 bgcolor=#d6d6d6
| 393864 ||  || — || August 30, 2005 || Kitt Peak || Spacewatch || — || align=right | 2.6 km || 
|-id=865 bgcolor=#fefefe
| 393865 ||  || — || September 30, 2005 || Anderson Mesa || LONEOS || — || align=right data-sort-value="0.77" | 770 m || 
|-id=866 bgcolor=#d6d6d6
| 393866 ||  || — || September 29, 2005 || Mount Lemmon || Mount Lemmon Survey || — || align=right | 2.4 km || 
|-id=867 bgcolor=#d6d6d6
| 393867 ||  || — || September 30, 2005 || Kitt Peak || Spacewatch || EOS || align=right | 2.9 km || 
|-id=868 bgcolor=#d6d6d6
| 393868 ||  || — || September 23, 2005 || Kitt Peak || Spacewatch || — || align=right | 3.3 km || 
|-id=869 bgcolor=#d6d6d6
| 393869 ||  || — || September 26, 2005 || Kitt Peak || Spacewatch || EOS || align=right | 3.5 km || 
|-id=870 bgcolor=#d6d6d6
| 393870 ||  || — || October 1, 2005 || Mount Lemmon || Mount Lemmon Survey || — || align=right | 2.7 km || 
|-id=871 bgcolor=#d6d6d6
| 393871 ||  || — || October 1, 2005 || Kitt Peak || Spacewatch || EOS || align=right | 3.2 km || 
|-id=872 bgcolor=#d6d6d6
| 393872 ||  || — || August 27, 2005 || Anderson Mesa || LONEOS || — || align=right | 2.8 km || 
|-id=873 bgcolor=#d6d6d6
| 393873 ||  || — || October 1, 2005 || Mount Lemmon || Mount Lemmon Survey || — || align=right | 2.9 km || 
|-id=874 bgcolor=#d6d6d6
| 393874 ||  || — || October 1, 2005 || Mount Lemmon || Mount Lemmon Survey || — || align=right | 3.2 km || 
|-id=875 bgcolor=#d6d6d6
| 393875 ||  || — || September 23, 2005 || Kitt Peak || Spacewatch || — || align=right | 3.4 km || 
|-id=876 bgcolor=#d6d6d6
| 393876 ||  || — || October 1, 2005 || Kitt Peak || Spacewatch || EOS || align=right | 3.1 km || 
|-id=877 bgcolor=#d6d6d6
| 393877 ||  || — || October 1, 2005 || Mount Lemmon || Mount Lemmon Survey || — || align=right | 2.4 km || 
|-id=878 bgcolor=#fefefe
| 393878 ||  || — || October 3, 2005 || Bergisch Gladbac || W. Bickel || — || align=right data-sort-value="0.80" | 800 m || 
|-id=879 bgcolor=#d6d6d6
| 393879 ||  || — || October 6, 2005 || Kitt Peak || Spacewatch || — || align=right | 2.9 km || 
|-id=880 bgcolor=#fefefe
| 393880 ||  || — || September 23, 2005 || Catalina || CSS || — || align=right data-sort-value="0.81" | 810 m || 
|-id=881 bgcolor=#d6d6d6
| 393881 ||  || — || October 1, 2005 || Mount Lemmon || Mount Lemmon Survey || — || align=right | 3.3 km || 
|-id=882 bgcolor=#fefefe
| 393882 ||  || — || November 17, 1998 || Kitt Peak || Spacewatch || — || align=right data-sort-value="0.88" | 880 m || 
|-id=883 bgcolor=#d6d6d6
| 393883 ||  || — || October 1, 2005 || Kitt Peak || Spacewatch || — || align=right | 3.3 km || 
|-id=884 bgcolor=#fefefe
| 393884 ||  || — || October 3, 2005 || Catalina || CSS || — || align=right | 1.9 km || 
|-id=885 bgcolor=#fefefe
| 393885 ||  || — || September 24, 2005 || Anderson Mesa || LONEOS || — || align=right | 1.1 km || 
|-id=886 bgcolor=#fefefe
| 393886 ||  || — || October 7, 2005 || Catalina || CSS || — || align=right data-sort-value="0.77" | 770 m || 
|-id=887 bgcolor=#fefefe
| 393887 ||  || — || October 3, 2005 || Catalina || CSS || — || align=right data-sort-value="0.88" | 880 m || 
|-id=888 bgcolor=#d6d6d6
| 393888 ||  || — || September 25, 2005 || Kitt Peak || Spacewatch || VER || align=right | 2.8 km || 
|-id=889 bgcolor=#d6d6d6
| 393889 ||  || — || October 7, 2005 || Mount Lemmon || Mount Lemmon Survey || — || align=right | 2.6 km || 
|-id=890 bgcolor=#d6d6d6
| 393890 ||  || — || October 7, 2005 || Mount Lemmon || Mount Lemmon Survey || — || align=right | 3.3 km || 
|-id=891 bgcolor=#d6d6d6
| 393891 ||  || — || October 8, 2005 || Catalina || CSS || — || align=right | 3.4 km || 
|-id=892 bgcolor=#d6d6d6
| 393892 ||  || — || October 8, 2005 || Catalina || CSS || — || align=right | 4.0 km || 
|-id=893 bgcolor=#d6d6d6
| 393893 ||  || — || September 26, 2005 || Kitt Peak || Spacewatch || EOS || align=right | 2.6 km || 
|-id=894 bgcolor=#fefefe
| 393894 ||  || — || October 7, 2005 || Kitt Peak || Spacewatch || — || align=right data-sort-value="0.52" | 520 m || 
|-id=895 bgcolor=#d6d6d6
| 393895 ||  || — || September 23, 2005 || Kitt Peak || Spacewatch || — || align=right | 3.1 km || 
|-id=896 bgcolor=#d6d6d6
| 393896 ||  || — || September 29, 2005 || Kitt Peak || Spacewatch || — || align=right | 2.9 km || 
|-id=897 bgcolor=#d6d6d6
| 393897 ||  || — || October 8, 2005 || Kitt Peak || Spacewatch || EOS || align=right | 2.7 km || 
|-id=898 bgcolor=#d6d6d6
| 393898 ||  || — || October 8, 2005 || Kitt Peak || Spacewatch || VER || align=right | 2.8 km || 
|-id=899 bgcolor=#d6d6d6
| 393899 ||  || — || October 8, 2005 || Kitt Peak || Spacewatch || — || align=right | 2.6 km || 
|-id=900 bgcolor=#fefefe
| 393900 ||  || — || October 9, 2005 || Kitt Peak || Spacewatch || — || align=right data-sort-value="0.75" | 750 m || 
|}

393901–394000 

|-bgcolor=#d6d6d6
| 393901 ||  || — || October 9, 2005 || Kitt Peak || Spacewatch || — || align=right | 2.7 km || 
|-id=902 bgcolor=#d6d6d6
| 393902 ||  || — || September 26, 2005 || Kitt Peak || Spacewatch || — || align=right | 3.1 km || 
|-id=903 bgcolor=#fefefe
| 393903 ||  || — || October 1, 2005 || Mount Lemmon || Mount Lemmon Survey || — || align=right data-sort-value="0.58" | 580 m || 
|-id=904 bgcolor=#d6d6d6
| 393904 ||  || — || October 1, 2005 || Kitt Peak || Spacewatch || — || align=right | 2.3 km || 
|-id=905 bgcolor=#fefefe
| 393905 ||  || — || October 7, 2005 || Mount Lemmon || Mount Lemmon Survey || — || align=right data-sort-value="0.74" | 740 m || 
|-id=906 bgcolor=#fefefe
| 393906 ||  || — || October 22, 2005 || Goodricke-Pigott || R. A. Tucker || — || align=right data-sort-value="0.89" | 890 m || 
|-id=907 bgcolor=#FA8072
| 393907 ||  || — || October 24, 2005 || Kitt Peak || Spacewatch || — || align=right data-sort-value="0.65" | 650 m || 
|-id=908 bgcolor=#FFC2E0
| 393908 ||  || — || October 25, 2005 || Kitt Peak || Spacewatch || APO +1km || align=right | 1.1 km || 
|-id=909 bgcolor=#fefefe
| 393909 ||  || — || October 21, 2005 || Palomar || NEAT || — || align=right data-sort-value="0.97" | 970 m || 
|-id=910 bgcolor=#fefefe
| 393910 ||  || — || October 23, 2005 || Kitt Peak || Spacewatch || — || align=right data-sort-value="0.69" | 690 m || 
|-id=911 bgcolor=#d6d6d6
| 393911 ||  || — || October 23, 2005 || Kitt Peak || Spacewatch || EOS || align=right | 2.9 km || 
|-id=912 bgcolor=#d6d6d6
| 393912 ||  || — || October 23, 2005 || Junk Bond || D. Healy || — || align=right | 2.4 km || 
|-id=913 bgcolor=#d6d6d6
| 393913 ||  || — || October 24, 2005 || Kitt Peak || Spacewatch || — || align=right | 3.2 km || 
|-id=914 bgcolor=#d6d6d6
| 393914 ||  || — || October 24, 2005 || Kitt Peak || Spacewatch || — || align=right | 3.5 km || 
|-id=915 bgcolor=#d6d6d6
| 393915 ||  || — || October 22, 2005 || Kitt Peak || Spacewatch || VER || align=right | 3.3 km || 
|-id=916 bgcolor=#d6d6d6
| 393916 ||  || — || October 1, 2005 || Catalina || CSS || — || align=right | 2.9 km || 
|-id=917 bgcolor=#d6d6d6
| 393917 ||  || — || October 22, 2005 || Kitt Peak || Spacewatch || — || align=right | 2.5 km || 
|-id=918 bgcolor=#d6d6d6
| 393918 ||  || — || October 25, 2005 || Mount Lemmon || Mount Lemmon Survey || — || align=right | 3.8 km || 
|-id=919 bgcolor=#fefefe
| 393919 ||  || — || October 25, 2005 || Mount Lemmon || Mount Lemmon Survey || — || align=right data-sort-value="0.75" | 750 m || 
|-id=920 bgcolor=#fefefe
| 393920 ||  || — || October 22, 2005 || Palomar || NEAT || — || align=right data-sort-value="0.83" | 830 m || 
|-id=921 bgcolor=#d6d6d6
| 393921 ||  || — || October 23, 2005 || Catalina || CSS || — || align=right | 3.5 km || 
|-id=922 bgcolor=#fefefe
| 393922 ||  || — || October 23, 2005 || Palomar || NEAT || — || align=right data-sort-value="0.77" | 770 m || 
|-id=923 bgcolor=#fefefe
| 393923 ||  || — || October 25, 2005 || Kitt Peak || Spacewatch || — || align=right data-sort-value="0.82" | 820 m || 
|-id=924 bgcolor=#fefefe
| 393924 ||  || — || October 25, 2005 || Catalina || CSS || — || align=right | 1.0 km || 
|-id=925 bgcolor=#fefefe
| 393925 ||  || — || October 22, 2005 || Kitt Peak || Spacewatch || — || align=right data-sort-value="0.59" | 590 m || 
|-id=926 bgcolor=#d6d6d6
| 393926 ||  || — || October 22, 2005 || Kitt Peak || Spacewatch || — || align=right | 2.8 km || 
|-id=927 bgcolor=#d6d6d6
| 393927 ||  || — || October 22, 2005 || Kitt Peak || Spacewatch || — || align=right | 3.9 km || 
|-id=928 bgcolor=#d6d6d6
| 393928 ||  || — || October 22, 2005 || Kitt Peak || Spacewatch || — || align=right | 3.3 km || 
|-id=929 bgcolor=#d6d6d6
| 393929 ||  || — || October 22, 2005 || Kitt Peak || Spacewatch || — || align=right | 3.1 km || 
|-id=930 bgcolor=#d6d6d6
| 393930 ||  || — || October 22, 2005 || Kitt Peak || Spacewatch || — || align=right | 3.0 km || 
|-id=931 bgcolor=#d6d6d6
| 393931 ||  || — || October 22, 2005 || Kitt Peak || Spacewatch || — || align=right | 4.9 km || 
|-id=932 bgcolor=#d6d6d6
| 393932 ||  || — || October 24, 2005 || Kitt Peak || Spacewatch || — || align=right | 2.7 km || 
|-id=933 bgcolor=#d6d6d6
| 393933 ||  || — || October 24, 2005 || Kitt Peak || Spacewatch || — || align=right | 2.9 km || 
|-id=934 bgcolor=#d6d6d6
| 393934 ||  || — || October 24, 2005 || Kitt Peak || Spacewatch || — || align=right | 2.6 km || 
|-id=935 bgcolor=#d6d6d6
| 393935 ||  || — || October 24, 2005 || Kitt Peak || Spacewatch || — || align=right | 2.8 km || 
|-id=936 bgcolor=#d6d6d6
| 393936 ||  || — || October 25, 2005 || Mount Lemmon || Mount Lemmon Survey || — || align=right | 2.5 km || 
|-id=937 bgcolor=#fefefe
| 393937 ||  || — || October 26, 2005 || Kitt Peak || Spacewatch || — || align=right data-sort-value="0.77" | 770 m || 
|-id=938 bgcolor=#d6d6d6
| 393938 ||  || — || October 26, 2005 || Kitt Peak || Spacewatch || VER || align=right | 3.5 km || 
|-id=939 bgcolor=#d6d6d6
| 393939 ||  || — || October 25, 2005 || Kitt Peak || Spacewatch || — || align=right | 4.0 km || 
|-id=940 bgcolor=#d6d6d6
| 393940 ||  || — || October 10, 2005 || Kitt Peak || Spacewatch || — || align=right | 3.5 km || 
|-id=941 bgcolor=#d6d6d6
| 393941 ||  || — || October 13, 2005 || Kitt Peak || Spacewatch || URS || align=right | 2.5 km || 
|-id=942 bgcolor=#d6d6d6
| 393942 ||  || — || October 24, 2005 || Kitt Peak || Spacewatch || — || align=right | 3.0 km || 
|-id=943 bgcolor=#fefefe
| 393943 ||  || — || October 24, 2005 || Kitt Peak || Spacewatch || — || align=right data-sort-value="0.83" | 830 m || 
|-id=944 bgcolor=#fefefe
| 393944 ||  || — || October 24, 2005 || Kitt Peak || Spacewatch || — || align=right data-sort-value="0.65" | 650 m || 
|-id=945 bgcolor=#d6d6d6
| 393945 ||  || — || October 26, 2005 || Anderson Mesa || LONEOS || — || align=right | 4.3 km || 
|-id=946 bgcolor=#fefefe
| 393946 ||  || — || October 21, 2005 || Palomar || NEAT || — || align=right data-sort-value="0.68" | 680 m || 
|-id=947 bgcolor=#d6d6d6
| 393947 ||  || — || October 25, 2005 || Kitt Peak || Spacewatch || EOS || align=right | 2.9 km || 
|-id=948 bgcolor=#fefefe
| 393948 ||  || — || October 25, 2005 || Kitt Peak || Spacewatch || — || align=right data-sort-value="0.71" | 710 m || 
|-id=949 bgcolor=#d6d6d6
| 393949 ||  || — || October 25, 2005 || Kitt Peak || Spacewatch || — || align=right | 4.0 km || 
|-id=950 bgcolor=#d6d6d6
| 393950 ||  || — || October 25, 2005 || Mount Lemmon || Mount Lemmon Survey || — || align=right | 3.0 km || 
|-id=951 bgcolor=#d6d6d6
| 393951 ||  || — || October 27, 2005 || Kitt Peak || Spacewatch || — || align=right | 3.5 km || 
|-id=952 bgcolor=#fefefe
| 393952 ||  || — || October 27, 2005 || Kitt Peak || Spacewatch || — || align=right data-sort-value="0.80" | 800 m || 
|-id=953 bgcolor=#d6d6d6
| 393953 ||  || — || October 22, 2005 || Palomar || NEAT || — || align=right | 2.3 km || 
|-id=954 bgcolor=#fefefe
| 393954 ||  || — || October 22, 2005 || Catalina || CSS || — || align=right data-sort-value="0.75" | 750 m || 
|-id=955 bgcolor=#fefefe
| 393955 ||  || — || October 25, 2005 || Kitt Peak || Spacewatch || — || align=right data-sort-value="0.77" | 770 m || 
|-id=956 bgcolor=#d6d6d6
| 393956 ||  || — || October 25, 2005 || Kitt Peak || Spacewatch || — || align=right | 3.7 km || 
|-id=957 bgcolor=#d6d6d6
| 393957 ||  || — || October 25, 2005 || Kitt Peak || Spacewatch || EMA || align=right | 3.4 km || 
|-id=958 bgcolor=#fefefe
| 393958 ||  || — || October 25, 2005 || Kitt Peak || Spacewatch || — || align=right | 1.3 km || 
|-id=959 bgcolor=#fefefe
| 393959 ||  || — || October 25, 2005 || Kitt Peak || Spacewatch || V || align=right | 1.0 km || 
|-id=960 bgcolor=#fefefe
| 393960 ||  || — || October 25, 2005 || Kitt Peak || Spacewatch || — || align=right data-sort-value="0.64" | 640 m || 
|-id=961 bgcolor=#d6d6d6
| 393961 ||  || — || October 25, 2005 || Kitt Peak || Spacewatch || — || align=right | 2.8 km || 
|-id=962 bgcolor=#d6d6d6
| 393962 ||  || — || October 28, 2005 || Mount Lemmon || Mount Lemmon Survey || — || align=right | 3.8 km || 
|-id=963 bgcolor=#d6d6d6
| 393963 ||  || — || October 28, 2005 || Mount Lemmon || Mount Lemmon Survey || VER || align=right | 3.6 km || 
|-id=964 bgcolor=#d6d6d6
| 393964 ||  || — || October 27, 2005 || Kitt Peak || Spacewatch || — || align=right | 3.4 km || 
|-id=965 bgcolor=#d6d6d6
| 393965 ||  || — || October 28, 2005 || Socorro || LINEAR || EOS || align=right | 3.5 km || 
|-id=966 bgcolor=#d6d6d6
| 393966 ||  || — || October 24, 2005 || Kitt Peak || Spacewatch || EOS || align=right | 3.9 km || 
|-id=967 bgcolor=#d6d6d6
| 393967 ||  || — || October 24, 2005 || Kitt Peak || Spacewatch || — || align=right | 2.6 km || 
|-id=968 bgcolor=#d6d6d6
| 393968 ||  || — || October 26, 2005 || Kitt Peak || Spacewatch || — || align=right | 3.7 km || 
|-id=969 bgcolor=#d6d6d6
| 393969 ||  || — || October 26, 2005 || Kitt Peak || Spacewatch || — || align=right | 3.7 km || 
|-id=970 bgcolor=#fefefe
| 393970 ||  || — || October 26, 2005 || Kitt Peak || Spacewatch || — || align=right | 1.0 km || 
|-id=971 bgcolor=#fefefe
| 393971 ||  || — || October 26, 2005 || Kitt Peak || Spacewatch || — || align=right data-sort-value="0.79" | 790 m || 
|-id=972 bgcolor=#d6d6d6
| 393972 ||  || — || October 27, 2005 || Mount Lemmon || Mount Lemmon Survey || — || align=right | 3.4 km || 
|-id=973 bgcolor=#d6d6d6
| 393973 ||  || — || October 29, 2005 || Mount Lemmon || Mount Lemmon Survey || EOS || align=right | 2.3 km || 
|-id=974 bgcolor=#d6d6d6
| 393974 ||  || — || October 29, 2005 || Mount Lemmon || Mount Lemmon Survey || — || align=right | 3.0 km || 
|-id=975 bgcolor=#d6d6d6
| 393975 ||  || — || October 29, 2005 || Mount Lemmon || Mount Lemmon Survey || — || align=right | 2.9 km || 
|-id=976 bgcolor=#fefefe
| 393976 ||  || — || October 29, 2005 || Kitt Peak || Spacewatch || — || align=right data-sort-value="0.60" | 600 m || 
|-id=977 bgcolor=#d6d6d6
| 393977 ||  || — || October 28, 2005 || Mount Lemmon || Mount Lemmon Survey || — || align=right | 3.0 km || 
|-id=978 bgcolor=#fefefe
| 393978 ||  || — || October 31, 2005 || Socorro || LINEAR || — || align=right data-sort-value="0.75" | 750 m || 
|-id=979 bgcolor=#d6d6d6
| 393979 ||  || — || October 31, 2005 || Kitt Peak || Spacewatch || — || align=right | 2.9 km || 
|-id=980 bgcolor=#fefefe
| 393980 ||  || — || October 29, 2005 || Catalina || CSS || V || align=right | 1.1 km || 
|-id=981 bgcolor=#d6d6d6
| 393981 ||  || — || October 29, 2005 || Catalina || CSS || — || align=right | 3.5 km || 
|-id=982 bgcolor=#d6d6d6
| 393982 ||  || — || October 27, 2005 || Kitt Peak || Spacewatch || EOS || align=right | 2.7 km || 
|-id=983 bgcolor=#fefefe
| 393983 ||  || — || October 27, 2005 || Kitt Peak || Spacewatch || — || align=right data-sort-value="0.77" | 770 m || 
|-id=984 bgcolor=#fefefe
| 393984 ||  || — || October 29, 2005 || Mount Lemmon || Mount Lemmon Survey || — || align=right data-sort-value="0.75" | 750 m || 
|-id=985 bgcolor=#d6d6d6
| 393985 ||  || — || October 30, 2005 || Mount Lemmon || Mount Lemmon Survey || — || align=right | 2.6 km || 
|-id=986 bgcolor=#fefefe
| 393986 ||  || — || October 26, 2005 || Kitt Peak || Spacewatch || — || align=right data-sort-value="0.83" | 830 m || 
|-id=987 bgcolor=#d6d6d6
| 393987 ||  || — || October 29, 2005 || Kitt Peak || Spacewatch || VER || align=right | 3.6 km || 
|-id=988 bgcolor=#fefefe
| 393988 ||  || — || October 31, 2005 || Mount Lemmon || Mount Lemmon Survey || — || align=right data-sort-value="0.70" | 700 m || 
|-id=989 bgcolor=#d6d6d6
| 393989 ||  || — || October 25, 2005 || Kitt Peak || Spacewatch || — || align=right | 2.3 km || 
|-id=990 bgcolor=#fefefe
| 393990 ||  || — || October 25, 2005 || Kitt Peak || Spacewatch || — || align=right data-sort-value="0.78" | 780 m || 
|-id=991 bgcolor=#d6d6d6
| 393991 ||  || — || October 28, 2005 || Kitt Peak || Spacewatch || — || align=right | 2.5 km || 
|-id=992 bgcolor=#fefefe
| 393992 ||  || — || October 28, 2005 || Kitt Peak || Spacewatch || — || align=right data-sort-value="0.98" | 980 m || 
|-id=993 bgcolor=#d6d6d6
| 393993 ||  || — || October 31, 2005 || Kitt Peak || Spacewatch || — || align=right | 3.1 km || 
|-id=994 bgcolor=#d6d6d6
| 393994 ||  || — || October 29, 2005 || Kitt Peak || Spacewatch || — || align=right | 3.0 km || 
|-id=995 bgcolor=#d6d6d6
| 393995 ||  || — || October 30, 2005 || Socorro || LINEAR || — || align=right | 2.9 km || 
|-id=996 bgcolor=#d6d6d6
| 393996 ||  || — || October 28, 2005 || Catalina || CSS || EUP || align=right | 4.6 km || 
|-id=997 bgcolor=#fefefe
| 393997 ||  || — || October 30, 2005 || Kitt Peak || Spacewatch || — || align=right data-sort-value="0.85" | 850 m || 
|-id=998 bgcolor=#d6d6d6
| 393998 ||  || — || October 25, 2005 || Catalina || CSS || — || align=right | 5.1 km || 
|-id=999 bgcolor=#fefefe
| 393999 ||  || — || October 28, 2005 || Mount Lemmon || Mount Lemmon Survey || — || align=right data-sort-value="0.57" | 570 m || 
|-id=000 bgcolor=#FA8072
| 394000 ||  || — || October 29, 2005 || Mount Lemmon || Mount Lemmon Survey || — || align=right data-sort-value="0.66" | 660 m || 
|}

References

External links 
 Discovery Circumstances: Numbered Minor Planets (390001)–(395000) (IAU Minor Planet Center)

0393